= Serotonin reuptake inhibitor =

Class of drug

Serotonin

A serotonin reuptake inhibitor (SRI) is a type of drug which acts as a reuptake inhibitor of the neurotransmitter serotonin (5-hydroxytryptamine, or 5-HT) by blocking the action of the serotonin transporter (SERT). This in turn leads to increased extracellular concentrations of serotonin and, therefore, an increase in serotonergic neurotransmission. It is a type of monoamine reuptake inhibitor (MRI); other types of MRIs include dopamine reuptake inhibitors and norepinephrine reuptake inhibitors.

SRIs are not synonymous with selective serotonin reuptake inhibitors (SSRIs), as the latter term is usually used to describe the class of antidepressants of the same name, and because SRIs, unlike SSRIs, can either be selective or non-selective in their action. For example, cocaine, which non-selectively inhibits the reuptake of serotonin, norepinephrine, and dopamine, is an SRI but not an SSRI.

SRIs are used predominantly as antidepressants (e.g., SSRIs, SNRIs, and TCAs), though they are also commonly used in the treatment of other psychological conditions such as anxiety disorders and eating disorders. Less often, SRIs are also used to treat a variety of other medical conditions including neuropathic pain and fibromyalgia (e.g., duloxetine, milnacipran), and premature ejaculation (e.g., dapoxetine) as well as for dieting (e.g., sibutramine). Additionally, some clinically used drugs such as chlorpheniramine, dextromethorphan, and methadone possess SRI properties secondarily to their primary mechanism of action(s) and this contributes to their side effect and drug interaction profiles.

A closely related type of drug is a serotonin releasing agent (SRA), an example of which is fenfluramine.

== Comparison of SRIs ==
=== Binding profiles ===
Binding affinities of SRIs at MATs
| Medication | SERT | NET | DAT |
|---|---|---|---|
| Citalopram | 1.16 | 4070 | 28100 |
| Desmethylcitalopram | 3.6 | 1820 | 18300 |
| Escitalopram | 1.1 | 7841 | 27410 |
| Femoxetine | 11.0 | 760 | 2050 |
| Fluoxetine | 0.81 | 240 | 3600 |
| Fluvoxamine | 2.2 | 1300 | 9200 |
| Norfluoxetine | 1.47 | 1426 | 420 |
| Paroxetine | 0.13 | 40 | 490 |
| Sertraline | 0.29 | 420 | 25 |
| Desmethylsertraline | 3.0 | 390 | 129 |
| Zimelidine | 152 | 9400 | 11700 |
| Levomilnacipran | 19.0 | 10.5 | ND |
| Venlafaxine | 8.9 | 1060 | 9300 |
| Vilazodone | 1.6 | ND | ND |
| Vortioxetine | 5.4 | ND | ND |
| Amitriptyline | 4.30 | 35 | 3250 |
| Clomipramine | 0.28 | 38 | 2190 |
| Imipramine | 1.40 | 37 | 8500 |

=== SERT occupancy ===
SERT occupancy by SRIs at clinically approved dosages
| Medication | Dosage range (mg/day) | ~80% SERT occupancy (mg/day) | Ratio (dosage / 80% occupancy) |
|---|---|---|---|
| Citalopram | 20–40 | 40 | 0.5–1 |
| Escitalopram | 10–20 | 10 | 1–2 |
| Fluoxetine | 20–80 | 20 | 1–4 |
| Fluvoxamine | 50–350 | 70 | 0.71–5 |
| Paroxetine | 10–60 | 20 | 0.5–3 |
| Sertraline | 25–200 | 50 | 0.5–4 |
| Duloxetine | 20–120 | 30 | 0.67–4 |
| Venlafaxine | 75–375 | 75 | 1–5 |
| Clomipramine | 50–250 | 10 | 5–25 |

== List of SERT-selective SRIs ==
Many SRIs exist, an assortment of which are listed below. Note that only SRIs selective for the SERT over the other monoamine transporters (MATs) are listed below. For a list of SRIs that act at multiple MATs, see other monoamine reuptake inhibitor pages such as SNRI and SNDRI.

=== Selective serotonin reuptake inhibitors (SSRIs) ===
==== Marketed ====
- Citalopram (Celexa)
- Dapoxetine (Priligy)
- Escitalopram (Lexapro, Cipralex)
- Fluoxetine (Prozac)
- Fluvoxamine (Luvox)
- Paroxetine (Paxil, Seroxat)
- Sertraline (Zoloft, Lustral)

==== Discontinued ====
- Indalpine (Upstene)
- Zimelidine (Normud, Zelmid)

==== Never marketed ====
- Alaproclate (GEA-654)
- Cericlamine (JO-1017)
- Desmethylcitalopram
- Didesmethylcitalopram
- Femoxetine (FG-4963; Malexil)
- Ifoxetine (CGP-15,210-G)
- Omiloxetine
- Panuramine (WY-26,002)
- Pirandamine (AY-23,713)
- RTI-353
- Seproxetine ((S)-norfluoxetine)

=== Dual serotonin reuptake inhibitors and serotonin receptor modulators ===
==== Marketed ====
- Trazodone (Desyrel)
- Vilazodone (Viibryd)
- Vortioxetine (Trintellix)

==== Never marketed ====
- Cianopramine (Ro 11-2465)
- Litoxetine (SL-810,385)
- Lubazodone (YM-992, YM-35,995)
- SB-649,915

=== Serotonin reuptake inhibition as a weaker/unintended secondary effect ===
==== Marketed ====
- Dextromethorphan (DXM; Robitussin)
- Dextropropoxyphene (Darvon)
- Dimenhydrinate (Dramamine)
- Diphenhydramine (Benadryl)
- Mepyramine (pyrilamine) (Anthisan)
- Mifepristone (Korlym, Mifeprex)

==== Never marketed ====
- 4′-Fluorococaine (also a Dopamine reuptake inhibitor)
- Delucemine (also an NMDA antagonist)
- Mesembrenone (also a weak PDE4 inhibitor (found in Sceletium tortuosum (kanna))
- Mesembrine (also a weak PDE4 inhibitor (found in Sceletium tortuosum (kanna))
- Roxindole (EMD-49,980) (also a 5-HT_{1A} and D_{2}-like receptor agonist)

== See also ==
- Dopamine reuptake inhibitor
- Monoamine reuptake inhibitor
- SNTX-2643
