= Cericlamine =

Chemical compound

Clinical data
- Other names: JO-1017
- Routes of administration: Oral
- ATC code: None

Pharmacokinetic data
- Elimination half-life: 8 hours

Identifiers
- IUPAC name: 3-(3,4-Dichlorophenyl)-2-(dimethylamino)-2-methylpropan-1-ol
- CAS Number: 112922-55-1
- PubChem CID: 131074
- ChemSpider: 115890
- UNII: VES82D23IB
- CompTox Dashboard (EPA): DTXSID00869558

Chemical and physical data
- Formula: C_{12}H_{17}Cl_{2}NO
- Molar mass: 262.17 g·mol^{−1}
- 3D model (JSmol): Interactive image
- SMILES: CC(CC1=CC(=C(C=C1)Cl)Cl)(CO)N(C)C
- InChI: InChI=1S/C12H17Cl2NO/c1-12(8-16,15(2)3)7-9-4-5-10(13)11(14)6-9/h4-6,16H,7-8H2,1-3H3; Key:FWYRGHMKHZXXQX-UHFFFAOYSA-N

Cericlamine (INN; developmental code JO-1017) is a potent and moderately selective serotonin reuptake inhibitor (SSRI) of the amphetamine family (specifically, a derivative of phentermine, and closely related to chlorphentermine, a highly selective serotonin releasing agent) that was investigated as an antidepressant for the treatment of depression, anxiety disorders, and anorexia nervosa by Jouveinal but did not complete development and was never marketed. It reached phase III clinical trials in 1996 before development was discontinued in 1999.

According to Czech scientists, cericlamine is claimed to be part of a highly advanced “fifth generation” of antidepressants as was venlafaxine.

The daily dosage was reported to be 300mg.

== See also ==
- 3,4-Dichloroamphetamine
- Alaproclate
- Bupropion
- Chlorphentermine
- Clortermine
- Cloforex
- Etolorex
- Femoxetine
- Ifoxetine
- Indalpine
- Methylenedioxyphentermine
- Omiloxetine
- Panuramine
- para-Chloroamphetamine
- para-Chloromethamphetamine
- Phentermine
- Pirandamine
- Seproxetine
- Viqualine
- Zimelidine
