= Monoamine reuptake inhibitor =

Drug class

A monoamine reuptake inhibitor (MRI) is a drug that acts as a reuptake inhibitor of one or more of the three major monoamine neurotransmitters serotonin, norepinephrine, and dopamine by blocking the action of one or more of the respective monoamine transporters (MATs), which include the serotonin transporter (SERT), norepinephrine transporter (NET), and dopamine transporter (DAT). This in turn results in an increase in the synaptic concentrations of one or more of these neurotransmitters and therefore an increase in monoaminergic neurotransmission.

== Uses ==
The majority of currently approved antidepressants act predominantly or exclusively as MRIs, including the selective serotonin reuptake inhibitors (SSRIs), serotonin–norepinephrine reuptake inhibitors (SNRIs), and almost all of the tricyclic antidepressants (TCAs). Many psychostimulants used either in the treatment of ADHD or as appetite suppressants in the treatment of obesity also behave as MRIs, although notably amphetamine (and methamphetamine), which do act to some extent as monoamine reuptake inhibitors, exerts their effects primarily as releasing agents. Additionally, psychostimulants acting as MRIs that affect dopamine such as cocaine and methylphenidate are often abused as recreational drugs. As a result, many of them have become controlled substances, which in turn has resulted in the clandestine synthesis of a vast array of designer drugs for the purpose of bypassing drug laws; a prime example of such is the mixed monoamine reuptake inhibitor and releasing agent mephedrone.

== Types of MRIs ==
There are a variety of different kinds of MRIs, of which include the following:

- Specific for one monoamine transporter
  - Serotonin reuptake inhibitor (SRI)
    - Selective serotonin reuptake inhibitor (SSRI)
  - Norepinephrine reuptake inhibitor (NRI)
    - Selective norepinephrine reuptake inhibitor (sNRI)
  - Dopamine reuptake inhibitor (DRI)
- Non-specific, binding to two or more monoamine transporters
  - Serotonin–norepinephrine reuptake inhibitor (SNRI)
  - Serotonin–dopamine reuptake inhibitor (SDRI)
  - Norepinephrine–dopamine reuptake inhibitor (NDRI)
  - Serotonin–norepinephrine–dopamine reuptake inhibitor (SNDRI)

== Binding profiles ==
Binding profiles of MRIs at human MATs
Compound	SERT	NET	DAT	Type	Class
3-Methylmethcathinone	4500	80	270	NDRI	Stimulant
Amfonelic acid	ND	ND	207	DRI	Stimulant
Amineptine*	>100,000 (rat)	10,000 (rat)	1,000–1,400 (rat)	DRI	Stimulant
Amitriptyline	4.30	35	3,250	SNRI	TCA
Amoxapine	58	16.0	4,310	SNRI	TeCA
Amphetamine	>100,000	ND	ND	NDRA	Stimulant
D-Amphetamine	>100,000	530	2,900	NDRA	Stimulant
L-Amphetamine	>100,000	ND	ND	NRA	Stimulant
Atomoxetine	77	5	1,451	NRI	Stimulant
Bupropion	9,100	52,000	520	NDRI	Stimulant
Butriptyline	1,360	5,100	3,940	N/A (IA)	TCA
Chlorphenamine	15.2	1,440	1,060	SRI	Antihistamine
Citalopram	1.16	4,070	28,100	SRI	SSRI
Escitalopram	1.1	7,841	27,410	SRI	SSRI
Clomipramine	0.28	38	2,190	SNRI	TCA
Cocaethylene	3,878	>10,000	555	SDRI	Stimulant
Cocaine	304	779	478	SNDRI	Stimulant
Cocaine	313±17 (IC_{50})	292±34 (IC_{50})	211±19 (IC_{50})	SNDRI	Stimulant
Desipramine	17.6	0.83	3,190	SNRI	TCA
Desmethylcitalopram	3.6	1,820	18,300	SRI	SSRI
Desmethylsertraline	3.0	390	129	SRI	SSRI
Desmethylsibutramine	15	20	49	SNDRI	SNRI
(R)-Desmethylsibutramine	44	4	12	SNDRI	SNRI
(S)-Desmethylsibutramine	9,200	870	180	SNDRI	SNRI
Desoxypipradrol	53,700	550	50	NDRI	Stimulant
Desvenlafaxine*	47	531	ND	SNRI	SNRI
Didesmethylsibutramine	20	15	45	SNDRI	SNRI
(R)-Didesmethylsibutramine	140	13	8.9	SNDRI	SNRI
(S)-Didesmethylsibutramine	4,300	62	12	SNDRI	SNRI
Diphenhydramine	3,800	960	2,200	N/A (IA)	Antihistamine
Dosulepin (dothiepin)	8.6	46	5,310	SNRI	TCA
Doxepin	68	29.5	12,100	SNRI	TCA
Duloxetine*	3.7	20	439	SNRI	SNRI
Etoperidone	890	20,000	52,000	SRI	SARI
Eutylone	690	1,280	120	SNDRI	Stimulant
Femoxetine	11.0	760	2,050	SRI	SSRI
Fluoxetine	0.81	240	3,600	SRI	SSRI
Fluvoxamine	2.2	1,300	9,200	SRI	SSRI
GBR-12935	289	277	4.90	DRI	Stimulant
Hydroxybupropion	ND	1.7 (IC_{50})	>10 (IC_{50})	NDRI	Stimulant
Imipramine	1.40	37	8,500	SNRI	TCA
Indatraline	3.10	12.6	1.90	SNDRI	Stimulant
Iprindole	1,620	1,262	6,530	N/A (IA)	TCA
Lofepramine	70	5.4	18,000	SNRI	TCA
Maprotiline	5,800	11.1	1,000	NRI	TeCA
Mazindol	39	0.45	8.1	NDRI	Stimulant
MDPV	3,349	26	4.1	NDRI	Stimulant
Methamphetamine	>100,000	ND	ND	NDRA	Stimulant
D-Methamphetamine	>100,000	660	2,800	NDRA	Stimulant
L-Methamphetamine	>100,000	ND	ND	NRA	Stimulant
Methylphenidate	>10,000	788	121	NDRI	Stimulant
D-Methylphenidate	>10,000	206	161	NDRI	Stimulant
L-Methylphenidate	>6,700	>10,000	2,250	NDRI	Stimulant
Mianserin	4,000	71	9,400	NRI	TeCA
Milnacipran*	151	68	>100,000	SNRI	SNRI
Levomilnacipran*	19.0	10.5	>100,000	SNRI	SNRI
Mirtazapine	>100,000	4,600	>100,000	N/A (IA)	TeCA
Modafinil*	>50,000	136,000	4,043	DRI	Stimulant
Nefazodone	200	360	360	SNDRI	SARI
Nefopam	29	33	531	SNDRI	Analgesic
Nisoxetine	427	2.3	1,235	NRI	Stimulant
Nomifensine	1,010	15.6	56	NDRI	Stimulant
Norfluoxetine	1.47	1,426	420	SRI	SSRI
Nortriptyline	18	4.37	1,140	SNRI	TCA
Oxaprotiline	3,900	4.9	4,340	NRI	TeCA
Paroxetine	0.13	40	490	SRI	SSRI
Protriptyline	19.6	1.41	2,100	SNRI	TCA
Reboxetine	129	1.1	>10,000	NRI	Stimulant
Sertraline	0.29	420	25	SRI	SSRI
Sibutramine	298–2,800	350–5,451	943–1,200	SNDRI	SNRI
Trazodone	160	8,500	7,400	SRI	SARI
Trimipramine	149	2,450	3,780	SRI	TCA
Vanoxerine	73.2	79.2	4.3	DRI	Stimulant
Venlafaxine*	145	1,420	3,070	SNRI	SNRI
Vilazodone*	0.2	~60	ND	SRI	SMS
Viloxazine	17,300	155	>100,000	NRI	Stimulant
Vortioxetine*	5.4	890 (rat)	140 (rat)	SRI	SMS
Zimelidine	152	9,400	11,700	SRI	SSRI
Values are K_{i} (nM) or, in some cases, when denoted by an asterisk (*), IC_{50} (nM). The smaller the value, the more strongly the drug binds to or inhibits the transporter.

== See also ==
- Monoamine releasing agent
