= Chlorosibutramine =

Chemical compound

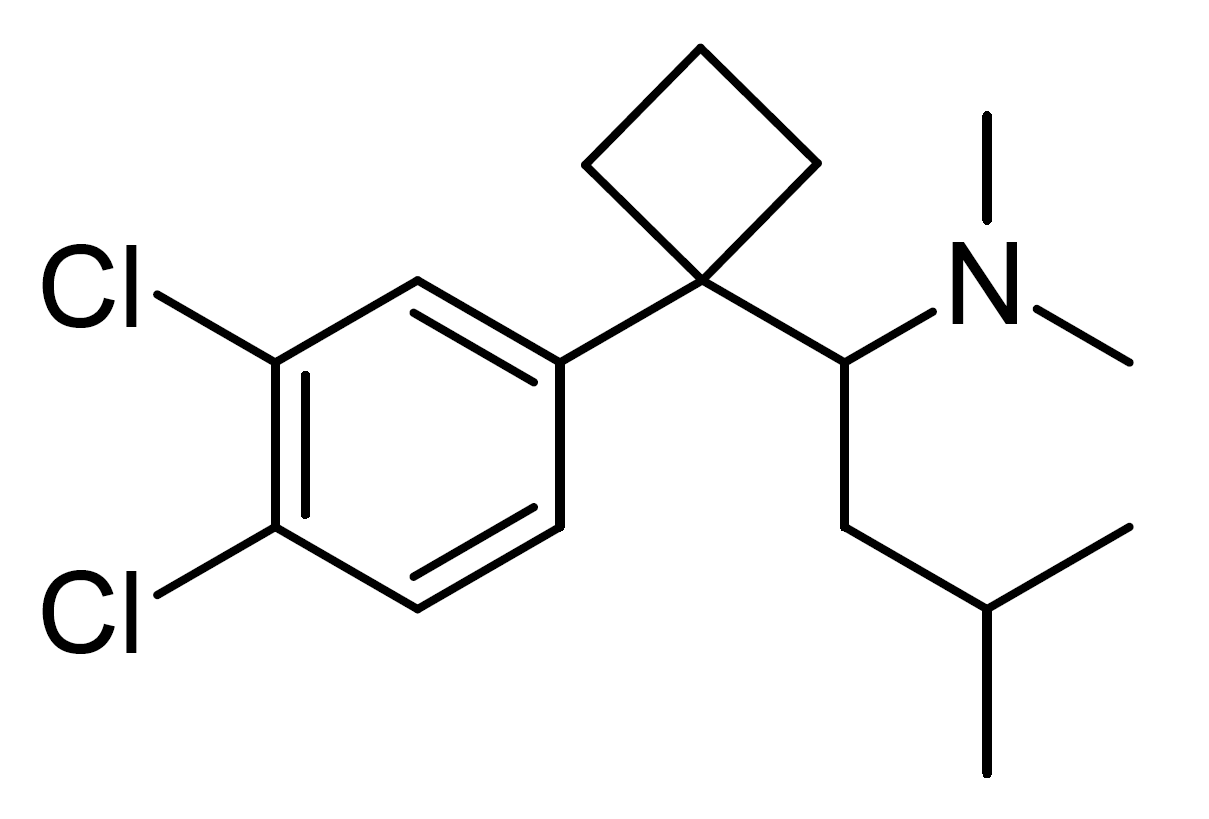

Identifiers
- IUPAC name: 1-(1-(3,4-dichlorophenyl)cyclobutyl)-N,N,3-trimethylbutan-1-amine
- CAS Number: 766462-77-5
- PubChem CID: 13083282
- ChemSpider: 14761596
- UNII: 3Z2HUY58WM
- CompTox Dashboard (EPA): DTXSID40517662

Chemical and physical data
- Formula: C_{17}H_{25}Cl_{2}N
- Molar mass: 314.29 g·mol^{−1}
- 3D model (JSmol): Interactive image
- SMILES: CC(C)CC(C1(CCC1)C2=CC(=C(C=C2)Cl)Cl)N(C)C
- InChI: InChI=1S/C17H25Cl2N/c1-12(2)10-16(20(3)4)17(8-5-9-17)13-6-7-14(18)15(19)11-13/h6-7,11-12,16H,5,8-10H2,1-4H3; Key:AYHHTXUMSBRQFM-UHFFFAOYSA-N

Chlorosibutramine is an analogue of the anorectic drug sibutramine, which has been sold as an ingredient in weight loss products sold as dietary supplements, first detected in South Korea in 2013. It is illegal in South Korea.

== See also ==
- Desmethylsibutramine
- Didesmethylsibutramine
- Chlorosipentramine
- O-2390
- LR-5182
- 3,4-CTMP
