= Tandamine =

Chemical compound

Clinical data
- ATC code: none

Identifiers
- IUPAC name: 2-(9-ethyl-1-methyl-3,4-dihydrothiopyrano[3,4-b]indol-1-yl)-N,N-dimethylethanamine
- CAS Number: 42408-80-0; HCl: 58167-78-5
- PubChem CID: 39187
- ChemSpider: 35851
- UNII: 6L5FH5A43E; HCl: 7516K9UGUG
- CompTox Dashboard (EPA): DTXSID70866094

Chemical and physical data
- Formula: C_{18}H_{26}N_{2}S
- Molar mass: 302.48 g·mol^{−1}
- 3D model (JSmol): Interactive image
- SMILES: CCn3c1ccccc1c2CCSC(C)(CCN(C)C)c23
- InChI: InChI=1S/C18H26N2S/c1-5-20-16-9-7-6-8-14(16)15-10-13-21-18(2,17(15)20)11-12-19(3)4/h6-9H,5,10-13H2,1-4H3; Key:BRPOADLGOFPKKJ-UHFFFAOYSA-N

Tandamine is a selective norepinephrine reuptake inhibitor with a tricyclic structure. It was developed in the 1970s as an antidepressant but was never commercialized. Tandamine is analogous to pirandamine, which, instead, acts as a selective serotonin reuptake inhibitor (SSRI).

The exact identical same structure, although this time changing the thioether to a methylene group revealed a strongest compound of the series called AY 24614.

== See also ==
- Pirandamine
