= Chlorosipentramine =

Chemical compound

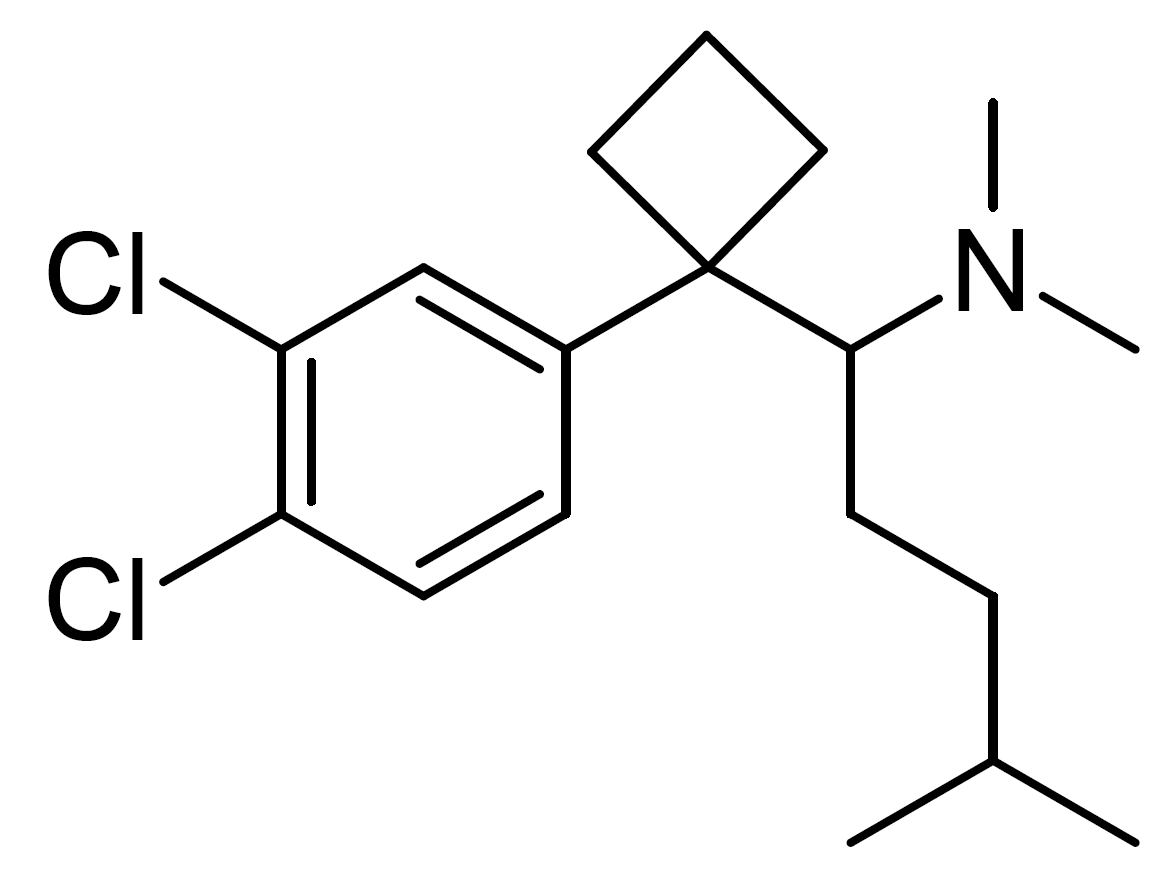

Identifiers
- IUPAC name: 1-[1-(3,4-dichlorophenyl)cyclobutyl]-N,N,4-trimethylpentan-1-amine
- CAS Number: 3058304-40-5
- PubChem CID: 172232171

Chemical and physical data
- Formula: C_{18}H_{27}Cl_{2}N
- Molar mass: 328.32 g·mol^{−1}
- 3D model (JSmol): Interactive image
- SMILES: CN(C)C(CCC(C)C)C1(CCC1)c1cc(Cl)c(Cl)cc1
- InChI: InChI=1S/C18H27Cl2N/c1-13(2)6-9-17(21(3)4)18(10-5-11-18)14-7-8-15(19)16(20)12-14/h7-8,12-13,17H,5-6,9-11H2,1-4H3; Key:LSXRRASCTGXSDY-UHFFFAOYSA-N

Chlorosipentramine is an analogue of the anorectic drug sibutramine, which has been sold as an ingredient in weight loss products sold as dietary supplements, first detected in South Korea in 2017. It is one of a number of sibutramine derivatives which have been sold in grey-market weight loss products since sibutramine itself was taken off the market due to safety concerns. Others include desmethylsibutramine, didesmethylsibutramine, homosibutramine, chlorosibutramine, and benzylsibutramine. Chlorosipentramine is illegal in South Korea along with other related compounds.

== See also ==
- 3F-PiHP
- 4-Cl-PHP
- O-2390
- 1-Methyl-3-propyl-4-(p-chlorophenyl)piperidine
- JZ-IV-10
