= C15H22ClN =

The molecular formula C_{15}H_{22}ClN may refer to:

- Didesmethylsibutramine
- 1-Methyl-3-propyl-4-(p-chlorophenyl)piperidine
