= Litoxetine =

Chemical compound

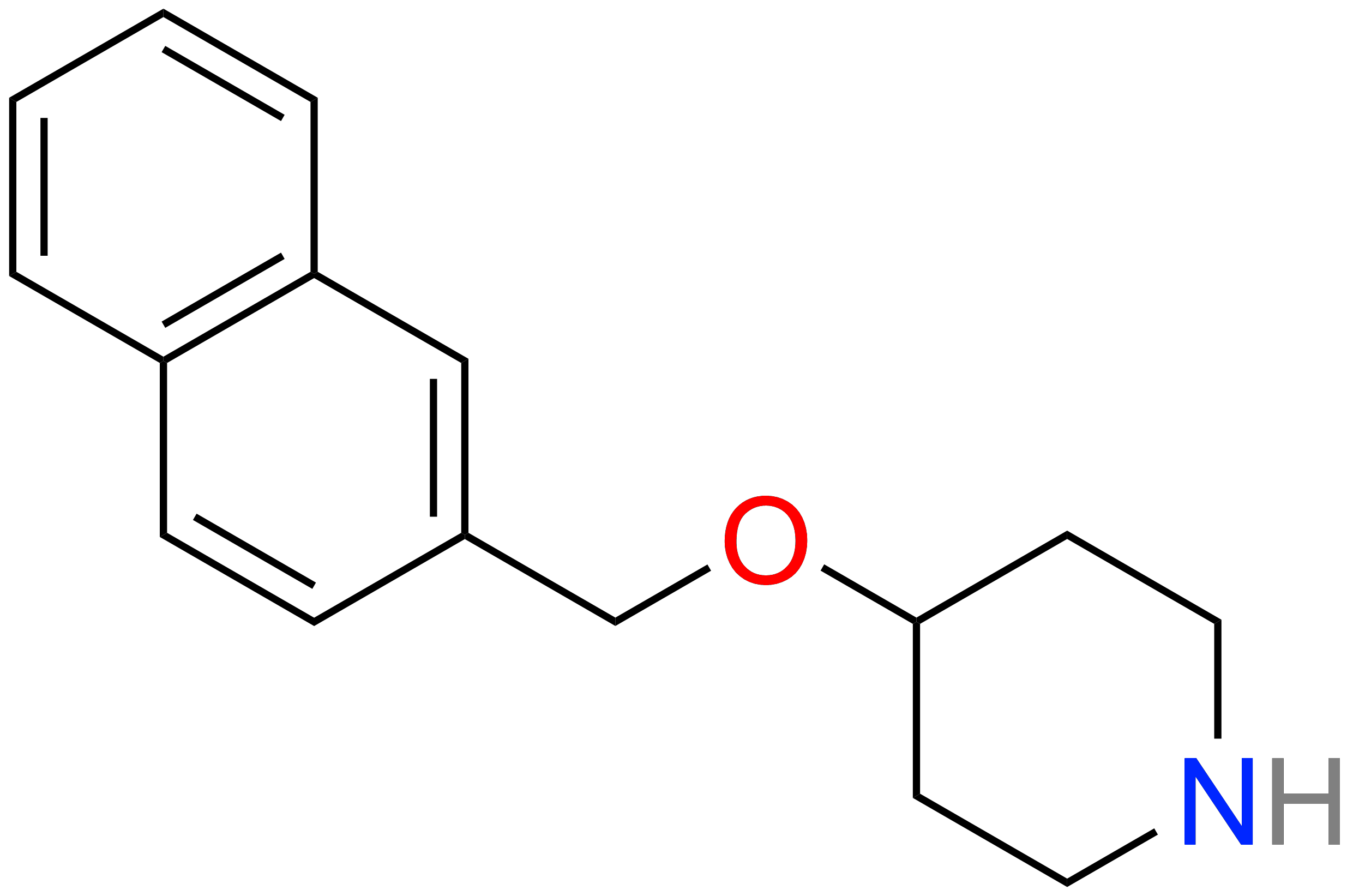

Clinical data
- Other names: SL 81-0385; IXA-001
- ATC code: None

Identifiers
- IUPAC name: 4-(naphthalen-2-ylmethoxy)piperidine
- CAS Number: 86811-09-8
- PubChem CID: 65650
- ChemSpider: 59087
- UNII: 9980ST005G
- ChEMBL: ChEMBL471036
- CompTox Dashboard (EPA): DTXSID30235828

Chemical and physical data
- Formula: C_{16}H_{19}NO
- Molar mass: 241.334 g·mol^{−1}
- 3D model (JSmol): Interactive image
- SMILES: C3CNCCC3OCc2cc1ccccc1cc2

Litoxetine (developmental code names SL 81-0385, IXA-001) is an antidepressant which was under clinical development for the treatment of depression in the early 1990s but was never marketed. It acts as a potent serotonin reuptake inhibitor (K_{i} for SERT = 7 nM) and modest 5-HT_{3} receptor antagonist (K_{i} = 315 nM). It has antiemetic activity, and unlike the selective serotonin reuptake inhibitors (SSRIs), appears to have a negligible incidence of nausea and vomiting. The drug is structurally related to indalpine. Development of litoxetine for depression was apparently ceased in the late 1990s. However, as of March 2017, development of litoxetine has been reinitiated and the drug is now in the phase II stage for the treatment of urinary incontinence.
