= Csóka =

Csóka (meaning "Western jackdaw") is Hungarian word and may refer to:

- Hungarian name for Čoka, a town in North Banat District, Serbia
- Hungarian name for Stârcu, a village in Ceanu Mare Commune, Cluj County, Romania

== People with the surname ==
- Antonei B. Csoka, biogerontologist

== See also ==
- Csókás (disambiguation)
