= Alaproclate =

Chemical compound

Clinical data
- Other names: GEA-654; 4-Chloro-α,α-dimethylphenethylalaninate; para-Chloro-α,α-dimethylphenethylalaninate; DL-Alanine p-chloro-α,α-dimethylphenylethyl ester
- Routes of administration: Oral
- ATC code: N06AB07 (WHO)

Legal status
- Legal status: In general: uncontrolled

Identifiers
- IUPAC name: 1-(4-Chlorophenyl)-2-methylpropan-2-yl 2-aminopropanoate
- CAS Number: 60719-82-6 60719-83-7 (hydrochloride)
- PubChem CID: 2081
- DrugBank: DB13233
- ChemSpider: 1997
- UNII: C4R42570ZO
- KEGG: D02787
- ChEMBL: ChEMBL36591
- CompTox Dashboard (EPA): DTXSID5045122

Chemical and physical data
- Formula: C_{13}H_{18}ClNO_{2}
- Molar mass: 255.74 g·mol^{−1}
- 3D model (JSmol): Interactive image
- SMILES: Clc1ccc(cc1)CC(OC(=O)C(N)C)(C)C
- InChI: InChI=1S/C13H18ClNO2/c1-9(15)12(16)17-13(2,3)8-10-4-6-11(14)7-5-10/h4-7,9H,8,15H2,1-3H3; Key:FZSPJBYOKQPKCD-UHFFFAOYSA-N

Alaproclate (developmental code name GEA-654) is a drug that was being developed as an antidepressant by the Swedish pharmaceutical company Astra AB (now AstraZeneca) in the 1970s.

It acts as a selective serotonin reuptake inhibitor (SSRI), and along with zimelidine and indalpine, was one of the first of its kind. Development was discontinued due to the observation of liver complications in rodent studies. In addition to its SSRI properties, alaproclate has been found to act as a non-competitive NMDA receptor antagonist, but does not have discriminative stimulus properties similar to phencyclidine (PCP).

The drug is similar in chemical structure to chlorphentermine, cloforex, and cericlamine, but is not itself a phenethylamine or amphetamine as it has an oxygen atom in place of the amine nitrogen.

Alaproclate was first described in the scientific literature by 1978.

== Synthesis ==

The Grignard reagent, methylmagnesium iodide, reacts with methyl 4-chlorophenylacetate (1) to give the tertiary alcohol 1-(4-chlorophenyl)-2-methyl-2-propanol (2). Acylation with 2-bromopropionyl bromide (3) gives the ester (4) which, when treated with ammonia, yields alaproclate.

== See also ==
- Femoxetine
- Indalpine
- Zimelidine
