= Cyanodothiepin =

Chemical compound

Clinical data
- Other names: BTS-56424
- ATC code: None

Identifiers
- IUPAC name: 11-(3-(dimethylamino)propylidene)-6,11-dihydrodibenzo[b,e]thiepine-2-carbonitrile
- CAS Number: 90667-37-1
- PubChem CID: 13276753
- ChemSpider: 30780728
- UNII: KK5VES2GLD
- CompTox Dashboard (EPA): DTXSID20534059

Chemical and physical data
- Formula: C_{20}H_{20}N_{2}S
- Molar mass: 320.45 g·mol^{−1}
- 3D model (JSmol): Interactive image
- SMILES: CN(C)CC/C=C1C2=C(C=CC(C#N)=C2)SCC3=C/1C=CC=C3
- InChI: InChI=1S/C20H20N2S/c1-22(2)11-5-8-18-17-7-4-3-6-16(17)14-23-20-10-9-15(13-21)12-19(18)20/h3-4,6-10,12H,5,11,14H2,1-2H3/b18-8+; Key:FSIRGTNPQFDCCD-QGMBQPNBSA-N

Cyanodothiepin (developmental code name BTS-56424) is a tricyclic antidepressant (TCA) acting as a potent and highly selective (over norepinephrine and dopamine uptake) inhibitor of the reuptake of serotonin that was never marketed. It also has moderate affinity for the muscarinic acetylcholine receptors and weak/negligible affinity for the α_{1}-adrenergic, 5-HT_{2A}, D_{1}, and D_{2} receptors; the H_{1} receptor has not been assayed, but cyanodothiepin is less sedating than the related drug cianopramine, suggesting that its antihistamine activity is not as pronounced as other TCAs. Cyanodothiepin is active in the forced swimming test (FST), implying that it may possess antidepressant properties in humans. However, it is only weakly active compared to cianopramine and imipramine in monoamine depletion-based tests of antidepressant potential.

== See also ==
- Clomipramine
