= Pipequaline =

Chemical compound

Clinical data
- ATC code: none

Identifiers
- IUPAC name: 2-phenyl-4-(2-piperidin-4-ylethyl)quinoline
- CAS Number: 77472-98-1
- PubChem CID: 71219
- ChemSpider: 64354
- UNII: J3S205V4I2
- CompTox Dashboard (EPA): DTXSID20228183

Chemical and physical data
- Formula: C_{22}H_{24}N_{2}
- Molar mass: 316.448 g·mol^{−1}
- 3D model (JSmol): Interactive image
- SMILES: n1c4c(c(cc1c2ccccc2)CCC3CCNCC3)cccc4
- InChI: InChI=1S/C22H24N2/c1-2-6-18(7-3-1)22-16-19(11-10-17-12-14-23-15-13-17)20-8-4-5-9-21(20)24-22/h1-9,16-17,23H,10-15H2; Key:AMEWZCMTSIONOX-UHFFFAOYSA-N

Pipequaline (INN; development code PK-8165) is an anxiolytic drug that was never marketed. It possesses a novel chemical structure that is not closely related to other drugs of this type. The drug has a similar pharmacological profile to the benzodiazepine family of drugs, but with mainly anxiolytic properties and very little sedative, amnestic or anticonvulsant effects, and so is classified as a nonbenzodiazepine anxiolytic.

Pipequaline acts as a non-selective GABA_{A} receptor partial agonist. While its profile of anxiolytic effects without sedation would appear to have potential medical applications, pipequaline has never been developed for medical use and is currently only used in scientific research.

== See also ==
- Indalpine
- Viqualine
