= Viqualine =

Medication

Identifiers
- IUPAC name: 4-[3-[(3R,4R)-3-Ethenylpiperidin-4-yl]propyl]-6-methoxyquinoline
- CAS Number: 72714-74-0
- PubChem CID: 3050111
- ChemSpider: 2312222
- UNII: 1Y3A5E2L1J
- ChEMBL: ChEMBL2104497
- CompTox Dashboard (EPA): DTXSID601024516

Chemical and physical data
- Formula: C_{20}H_{26}N_{2}O
- Molar mass: 310.441 g·mol^{−1}
- 3D model (JSmol): Interactive image
- SMILES: COC1=CC2=C(C=CN=C2C=C1)CCC[C@@H]3CCNC[C@@H]3C=C
- InChI: InChI=1S/C20H26N2O/c1-3-15-14-21-11-9-16(15)5-4-6-17-10-12-22-20-8-7-18(23-2)13-19(17)20/h3,7-8,10,12-13,15-16,21H,1,4-6,9,11,14H2,2H3/t15-,16+/m0/s1; Key:XFXANHWIBFMEOY-JKSUJKDBSA-N

Viqualine (INN; developmental code PK-5078) is an antidepressant and anxiolytic drug that was never marketed. It acts as a potent and selective serotonin releasing agent (SRA) and serotonin reuptake inhibitor (SRI) similarly to para-chloroamphetamine (PCA). In addition, viqualine displaces diazepam from the GABA_{A} receptor and produces benzodiazepine-like effects, indicating that it is also a positive allosteric modulator of the benzodiazepine site of the GABA_{A} receptor. The drug has mainly been researched as a potential treatment for alcoholism.

== See also ==
- Indalpine
- Pipequaline
