= Csókás =

Csókás (Hungarian: [ˈt͡ʃoːkaːʃ]) may refer to:

- Csókás, the Hungarian name for Ciocaşu village, Vințu de Jos Commune, Alba County, Romania
- Csókás, the Hungarian name for Ciocotiş village, Cernești Commune, Maramureș County, Romania
- Csókás-patak, the Hungarian name of the Stăuini River, Alba County, Romania

== People with the surname ==
- Marton Csokas (born 1966), New Zealand film and television actor

== See also ==
- Csóka (disambiguation)
