= Lubazodone =

Abandoned experimental antidepressant drug

Clinical data
- Other names: YM-992; YM-35995
- Routes of administration: Oral
- Drug class: Serotonin antagonist and reuptake inhibitor (SARI); Serotonin reuptake inhibitor; Serotonin 5-HT_{2A} receptor antagonist
- ATC code: None

Identifiers
- IUPAC name: (2S)-2-[(7-fluoro-2,3-dihydro-1H-inden-4-yl)oxymethyl]morpholine
- CAS Number: 161178-07-0
- PubChem CID: 157919
- ChemSpider: 138947
- UNII: 850TB2B172
- CompTox Dashboard (EPA): DTXSID30167074

Chemical and physical data
- Formula: C_{14}H_{18}FNO_{2}
- Molar mass: 251.301 g·mol^{−1}
- 3D model (JSmol): Interactive image
- SMILES: C1CC2=C(C=CC(=C2C1)F)OC[C@@H]3CNCCO3
- InChI: InChI=1S/C14H18FNO2/c15-13-4-5-14(12-3-1-2-11(12)13)18-9-10-8-16-6-7-17-10/h4-5,10,16H,1-3,6-9H2/t10-/m0/s1; Key:HTODIQZHVCHVGM-JTQLQIEISA-N

Lubazodone (developmental code names YM-992, YM-35995) is an experimental antidepressant which was under development by Yamanouchi for the treatment for major depressive disorder in the late 1990s and early 2000s but was never marketed.

It acts as a serotonin reuptake inhibitor (K_{i} for SERT = 21 nM) and 5-HT_{2A} receptor antagonist (K_{i} = 86 nM), and hence has the profile of a serotonin antagonist and reuptake inhibitor (SARI). The drug has good selectivity against a range of other monoamine receptors, with its next highest affinities being for the α_{1}-adrenergic receptor (K_{i} = 200 nM) and the 5-HT_{2C} receptor (K_{i} = 680 nM).

Lubazodone is structurally related to trazodone and nefazodone, but is a stronger serotonin reuptake inhibitor and weaker as a 5-HT_{2A} receptor antagonist in comparison to them and is more balanced in its actions as a SARI. It reached phase II clinical trials for depression, but development was discontinued in 2001 reportedly due to the "erosion of the SSRI market in the United States".

== See also ==
- Serotonin antagonist and reuptake inhibitor
- List of investigational antidepressants
