= Cianopramine =

Chemical compound

Clinical data
- ATC code: none

Identifiers
- IUPAC name: 5-[3-(Dimethylamino)propyl]-10,11-dihydro-5H-dibenzo[b,f]azepine-3-carbonitrile
- CAS Number: 66834-24-0
- PubChem CID: 48126
- ChemSpider: 43782
- UNII: 02MNR4P2PM
- ChEMBL: ChEMBL2106504
- CompTox Dashboard (EPA): DTXSID90216956

Chemical and physical data
- Formula: C_{20}H_{23}N_{3}
- Molar mass: 305.425 g·mol^{−1}
- 3D model (JSmol): Interactive image
- SMILES: N#Cc1ccc3c(c1)N(c2ccccc2CC3)CCCN(C)C

Cianopramine (INN; development code Ro 11-2465; also known as 3-cyanoimipramine) is a tricyclic antidepressant related to imipramine that acts as a serotonin reuptake inhibitor and weak serotonin receptor antagonist. It was investigated for the treatment of depression but was never marketed.

== See also ==
- Clomipramine
- Cyanodothiepin
- Cyamemazine
