= SB-649915 =

Chemical compound

Clinical data
- Other names: SB649915; SB-649,915
- Drug class: Serotonin reuptake inhibitor; Serotonin 5-HT_{1A} receptor antagonist; Serotonin 5-HT_{1B} receptor antagonist
- ATC code: None

Legal status
- Legal status: In general: uncontrolled

Identifiers
- IUPAC name: 6-[[1-[2-(2-methylquinolin-5-yl)oxyethyl]piperidin-4-yl]methyl]-4H-1,4-benzoxazin-3-one
- CAS Number: 420785-70-2
- PubChem CID: 10296414
- IUPHAR/BPS: 76
- ChemSpider: 8471882
- UNII: HD3UV2MFJ8
- ChEMBL: ChEMBL183460

Chemical and physical data
- Formula: C_{26}H_{29}N_{3}O_{3}
- Molar mass: 431.536 g·mol^{−1}
- 3D model (JSmol): Interactive image
- SMILES: CC1=NC2=C(C=C1)C(=CC=C2)OCCN3CCC(CC3)CC4=CC5=C(C=C4)OCC(=O)N5
- InChI: InChI=1S/C26H29N3O3/c1-18-5-7-21-22(27-18)3-2-4-24(21)31-14-13-29-11-9-19(10-12-29)15-20-6-8-25-23(16-20)28-26(30)17-32-25/h2-8,16,19H,9-15,17H2,1H3,(H,28,30); Key:PJSUYRBCBFPCQW-UHFFFAOYSA-N

SB-649915 is a serotonin reuptake inhibitor and serotonin 5-HT_{1A} and 5-HT_{1B} receptor antagonist which is being investigated for its antidepressant effects. Relative to the selective serotonin reuptake inhibitors (SSRIs), SB-649,915 has a faster onset of action and may also have greater clinical efficacy as well. This can be attributed to blockade of 5-HT_{1A} and 5-HT_{1B} autoreceptors which inhibit serotonin release.

== See also ==
- Serotonin antagonist and reuptake inhibitor
- Elzasonan
- LY-367,265
