= Femoxetine =

Chemical compound

Clinical data
- Routes of administration: Oral
- ATC code: None

Legal status
- Legal status: In general: uncontrolled

Pharmacokinetic data
- Elimination half-life: 7–27 hours

Identifiers
- IUPAC name: (3R,4S)-3-[(4-methoxyphenoxy)methyl]-1-methyl-4-phenyl-piperidine
- CAS Number: 59859-58-4
- PubChem CID: 3012003
- ChemSpider: 2280941
- UNII: 8Y719ZLX8C
- ChEMBL: ChEMBL94739
- CompTox Dashboard (EPA): DTXSID70208576

Chemical and physical data
- Formula: C_{20}H_{25}NO_{2}
- Molar mass: 311.425 g·mol^{−1}
- 3D model (JSmol): Interactive image
- SMILES: O(c1ccc(OC)cc1)C[C@@H]3[C@@H](c2ccccc2)CCN(C)C3
- InChI: InChI=1S/C20H25NO2/c1-21-13-12-20(16-6-4-3-5-7-16)17(14-21)15-23-19-10-8-18(22-2)9-11-19/h3-11,17,20H,12-15H2,1-2H3/t17-,20-/m1/s1; Key:OJSFTALXCYKKFQ-YLJYHZDGSA-N

Femoxetine (INN; tentative brand name Malexil; developmental code name FG-4963) is a drug related to paroxetine that was being developed as an antidepressant by Danish pharmaceutical company Ferrosan in 1975 before acquisition of the company by Novo Nordisk. It acts as a selective serotonin reuptake inhibitor (SSRI). Development was halted to focus attention on paroxetine instead, as femoxetine could not be administered as a daily pill.

Both femoxetine and paroxetine were invented in the 1970s. Jørgen Anders Christensen's name is on the patents and Jorgen Buus-Lassen's name is on the pharmacology paper.

After Ferrosan's acquisition, femoxetine died from neglect.

In a separate patent, Ferrosan stated that Femoxetine could be used as an appetite suppressant, using ten times the dosage than for paroxetine, 300 - 400mg daily.

Femoxetine has the same stereochemical properties as Nocaine, another agent with a similar structure claimed to have been synthesized using arecoline as the starting alkaloid.

== Analogs ==
1. Addition of the para-fluoro atom results in a different compound that is a hybrid of femoxetine & paroxetine named FG 7080, which has a separate patent. According to the patent tables, incorporation of the fluorine atom potentiated the 5-HT affinity considerably.
2. Pfizer made some similar analogs E.g. a Viloxazine type of catechol ether is used, but 4-phenyl instead of based on a morpholine ring.
3. NNC-63-0780. binds to ORL1 instead of SERT.
- NNC 09-0026

== See also ==
- Alaproclate
- Indalpine
- Zimelidine
