= Panuramine =

Chemical compound

Clinical data
- ATC code: None

Identifiers
- IUPAC name: N-{[1-(naphthalen-2-ylmethyl)piperidin-4-yl]carbamoyl}benzamide
- CAS Number: 80349-58-2 80349-03-7 (HCl)
- PubChem CID: 72002
- ChemSpider: 65002
- UNII: 1UWS3T8EAB
- CompTox Dashboard (EPA): DTXSID30230257

Chemical and physical data
- Formula: C_{24}H_{25}N_{3}O_{2}
- Molar mass: 387.483 g·mol^{−1}
- 3D model (JSmol): Interactive image
- SMILES: O=C(c1ccccc1)NC(=O)NC4CCN(Cc2ccc3c(c2)cccc3)CC4

Panuramine (Wy-26,002) is an antidepressant which was synthesized in 1981 by Wyeth. It acts as a potent and selective serotonin reuptake inhibitor (SSRI). It was never marketed.

== See also ==
- Selective serotonin reuptake inhibitor
