= National Obesity Forum =

Organization

The National Obesity Forum is a British independent professional organisation which campaigns for a more interventionist approach to obesity. It was established in May 2000.

In June 2012 the Forum complained that GPs in England were rewarded financially through the Quality and Outcomes Framework for recording the number of obese patients - yet not for doing anything about it.

In February 2013 the Chairman Dr David Haslam called for stomach surgery to be offered to obese children.

== See also ==
- Obesity in the United Kingdom
