= RTI-353 =

Chemical compound

Identifiers
- IUPAC name: Methyl (1R,2S,3S,5S)-3-(4-ethyl-3-iodophenyl)-8-azabicyclo[3.2.1]octane-2-carboxylate
- CAS Number: 198990-83-9
- PubChem CID: 9801045
- UNII: ZSB3P8YAZ9
- CompTox Dashboard (EPA): DTXSID101028799

Chemical and physical data
- Formula: C_{17}H_{22}INO_{2}
- Molar mass: 399.272 g·mol^{−1}
- 3D model (JSmol): Interactive image
- SMILES: CCC1=C(C=C(C=C1)[C@H]2C[C@@H]3CC[C@H]([C@H]2C(=O)OC)N3)I

RTI(-4229)-353 is a phenyltropane derived drug which acts as an SSRI. Tamagnan et al. also made some phenyltropanes with high activity and selectivity for the SERT (pM affinity).

== See also ==
- RTI-83
- Troparil
- Tropine
- Tropinone
