= David Haslam (GP) =

British doctor

David William Haslam (11 May 1962 - 23 August 2021) was an English general practitioner and physician specialising in obesity medicine at the Centre for Obesity Research at Luton & Dunstable Hospital. He graduated from St. Thomas' Hospital Medical School in 1985.

Haslam was the Chair of the National Obesity Forum. He was also a member of the group Experts in Severe and Complex Obesity. In 2010, he warned that the wrong people were getting bariatric surgery and said some of those who are most obese should just be offered "palliative care" for their obesity.

In December 2013, he was one of a number of doctors who signed a letter to Jeremy Hunt urging that the battle against dementia should focus on the benefits of a Mediterranean diet rather than drugs of dubious efficacy.

== Select bibliography ==
- Fat, Gluttony and Sloth: Obesity in Literature, Art and Medicine, by David Haslam and Fiona Haslam (2009). Liverpool University Press. ISBN 1846310946.
- The Obesity Epidemic and Its Management: A Textbook for Primary Healthcare Professionals on the Understanding, Management and Treatment of Obesity, by Terry Maguire and David Haslam (2010). Pharmaceutical Press. ISBN 0853697868.
- Bariatric Surgery in Clinical Practice [editor and contributor] (2022). Springer Publishing. ISBN 9783030833992.
