= Didesmethylsibutramine =

Chemical compound

Identifiers
- IUPAC name: 1-[1-(4-chlorophenyl)cyclobutyl]-3-methylbutan-1-amine
- CAS Number: 84467-54-9
- PubChem CID: 134772
- ChemSpider: 118777
- UNII: 987R943R3P
- CompTox Dashboard (EPA): DTXSID801004734
- ECHA InfoCard: 100.125.498

Chemical and physical data
- Formula: C_{15}H_{22}ClN
- Molar mass: 251.80 g·mol^{−1}
- 3D model (JSmol): Interactive image
- SMILES: CC(C)CC(C1(CCC1)C2=CC=C(C=C2)Cl)N
- InChI: InChI=1S/C15H22ClN/c1-11(2)10-14(17)15(8-3-9-15)12-4-6-13(16)7-5-12/h4-7,11,14H,3,8-10,17H2,1-2H3; Key:WQSACWZKKZPCHN-UHFFFAOYSA-N

Didesmethylsibutramine (also known as dinorsibutramine , bisnorsibutramine, and BTS-54524) is an active metabolite of the anorectic drug sibutramine that has been identified as an adulterant in weight loss supplements. Data on the activity of didesmethylsibutramine in humans is limited, although a case of psychosis associated with didesmethylsibutramine use was reported in 2019.

== Pharmacology ==
MAT Affinity (K_{i} nM)
	SERT	NET	DAT
Racemate	20	15	45
(R)	140	13	8.9
(S)	4,300	62	12

Didesmethylsibutramine acts as a triple reuptake inhibitor, blocking the reabsorption of serotonin, dopamine, and norepinephrine from neuronal synapses. The (R)-enantiomer of didesmethylsibutramine is a more potent inhibitor of monoamine reuptake than the (S)-enantiomer and possesses significantly stronger anorectic activity in animals.

=== Pharmacokinetics ===
Following sibutramine administration in humans, didesmethylsibutramine (M2) is formed through the N-demethylation of desmethylsibutramine (M1) by CYP2B6. Elevated plasma levels of sibutramine are observed with concomitant use of CYP2B6 inhibitors (e.g. clopidogrel) and in individuals with certain CYP2B6 genotypes due to the reduced conversion of sibutramine into desmethylsibutramine.

== See also ==
- Chlorosipentramine
