= Antonei Csoka =

Antonei B. Csoka
- Education: University of Debrecen
- Scientific career
- Fields: aging, biogerontology, epigenetics
- Workplaces: Howard University

Antonei Benjamin Csoka is a biogerontologist at Howard University who works on the molecular biology of aging, regenerative medicine, and epigenetics.

== Education ==
Csoka earned a bachelor's degrees at Newcastle University in Genetics. He has a master's in Molecular Pathology from University of Leicester and a PhD in Cellular and Molecular Biology from University of Debrecen.

== Research career ==
He was a member of the consortium that identified the Lamin A gene as the cause of the accelerated aging disease Hutchinson–Gilford progeria syndrome and participated in the first National Institutes of Health – Progeria Research Foundation workshop. He also showed that progeria is a true representation of aging with respect to cellular signaling pathways, and truly recapitulates the normal aging process at the cellular level. He currently researches the molecular etiology of aging at the level of signaling pathways.

== Publications ==
Csoka has authored and co-authored over 40 scientific papers.

== Life extension activities ==
Csoka is a proponent of life extension, cryonics, and transhumanism, and has been identified as one of the top twenty-three socially connected professors on Twitter. He is a scientific advisor to the Alcor Life Extension Foundation, the UK Cryonics and Cryopreservation Research Network, and the Lifeboat Foundation, a fellow of the Global Healthspan Policy Institute, and was featured in the first Immortality Institute film, Exploring Life Extension (2005) produced by Bruce Klein.

== Bibliography ==
- Neurochemical Basis of Brain Function and Dysfunction ISBN 978-1789859997
