= Pirandamine =

Chemical compound

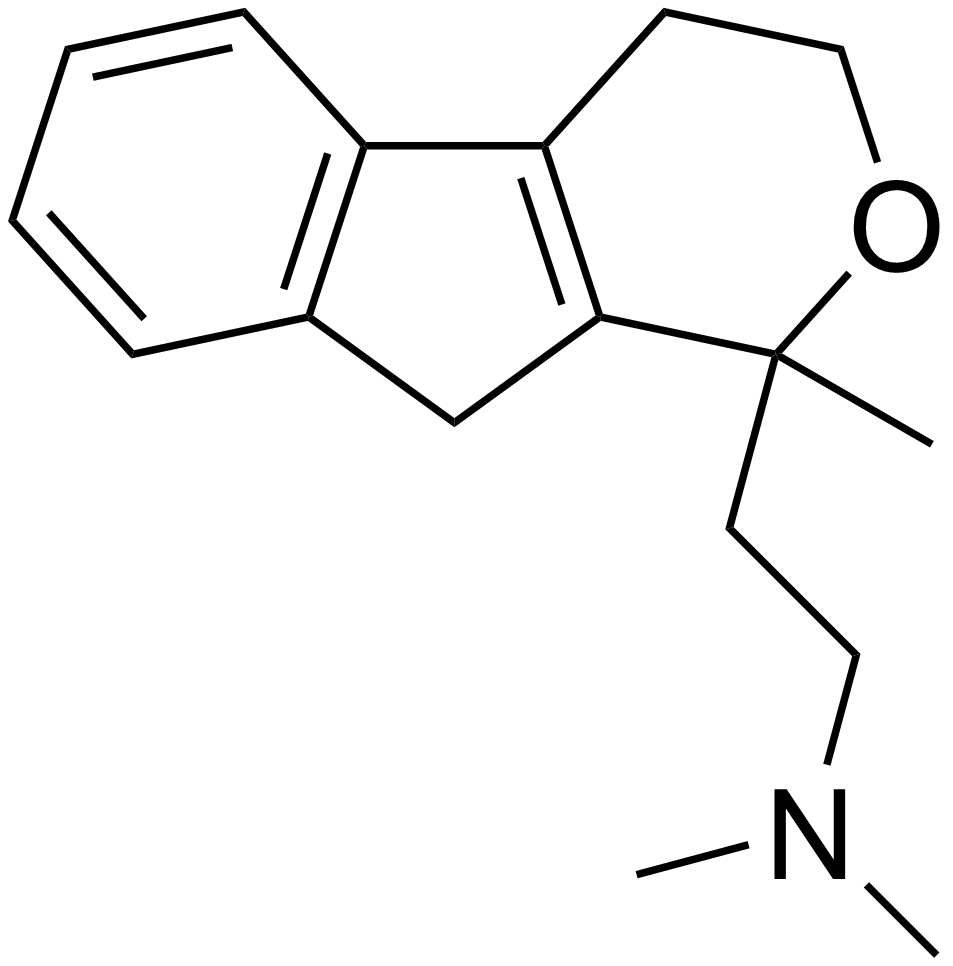

Clinical data
- Routes of administration: Oral
- ATC code: none

Legal status
- Legal status: In general: uncontrolled

Identifiers
- IUPAC name: N,N-dimethyl-2-(1-methyl-4,9-dihydro-3H-indeno[2,3-c]pyran-1-yl)ethanamine
- CAS Number: 42408-79-7
- PubChem CID: 431429
- ChemSpider: 381558
- UNII: WC6V8L1Z13
- CompTox Dashboard (EPA): DTXSID10866093

Chemical and physical data
- Formula: C_{17}H_{23}NO
- Molar mass: 257.377 g·mol^{−1}
- 3D model (JSmol): Interactive image
- SMILES: CC1(C2=C(CCO1)C3=CC=CC=C3C2)CCN(C)C
- InChI: InChI=1S/C17H23NO/c1-17(9-10-18(2)3)16-12-13-6-4-5-7-14(13)15(16)8-11-19-17/h4-7H,8-12H2,1-3H3; Key:AMJPIGOYWBNJLP-UHFFFAOYSA-N

Pirandamine (AY-23,713) is a tricyclic derivative which acts as a selective serotonin reuptake inhibitor (SSRI). It was investigated in the 1970s as a potential antidepressant but clinical development was not commenced and it was never marketed. Pirandamine is structurally related to tandamine, which, in contrast, is a selective norepinephrine reuptake inhibitor.

== Synthesis ==
Pirandamine can be synthesized starting from 1-indanone. The Reformatsky reaction between 1-indanone (1) and ethyl bromoacetate in the presence of zinc gives ethyl 2-(1-hydroxy-2,3-dihydroinden-1-yl)acetate (2). The reduction of the ester with ester with lithium aluminum hydride (LiAlH_{4}) gives 1-(2-hydroxyethyl)-2,3-dihydroinden-1-ol (3). Acid-catalyzed dehydration then leads to indene-3-ethanol (4). Acid-catalyzed condensation with ethyl acetoacetate then gives (5). The saponification of the ester then gives the corresponding acid. The reaction of this with ethyl chloroformate gives a mixed anhydride, and further reaction of this with dimethylamine then leads to the amide (6). Reduction with lithium aluminium hydride completes the synthesis of pirandamine (7).

Pirandamine synthesis

== See also ==
- Tandamine
