= Ifoxetine =

Chemical compound

Clinical data
- Routes of administration: Oral
- ATC code: none

Legal status
- Legal status: In general: uncontrolled

Identifiers
- IUPAC name: (3R,4S)-4-(2,3-dimethylphenoxy)piperidin-3-ol
- CAS Number: 66208-11-5
- PubChem CID: 71971
- ChemSpider: 64977
- UNII: LHH887104B
- ChEMBL: ChEMBL2218865
- CompTox Dashboard (EPA): DTXSID10216397

Chemical and physical data
- Formula: C_{13}H_{19}NO_{2}
- Molar mass: 221.300 g·mol^{−1}
- 3D model (JSmol): Interactive image
- SMILES: O(c1cccc(c1C)C)[C@H]2CCNC[C@H]2O

Ifoxetine (CGP-15,210-G) is a selective serotonin reuptake inhibitor (SSRI) which was investigated as an antidepressant in the 1980s but was never marketed. Ifoxetine selectively blocks the reuptake of serotonin in the brain supposedly without affecting it in the periphery. Supporting this claim, ifoxetine was found to be efficacious in clinical trials and was very well tolerated, producing almost no physical side effects or other complaints of significant concern.
