= Omiloxetine =

Chemical compound

Clinical data
- ATC code: None

Identifiers
- IUPAC name: 2-[(3R,4S)-3-[(1,3-benzodioxol-5-yloxy)methyl]-4-(4-fluorophenyl)-1-piperidinyl]-1-(4-fluorophenyl)ethanone
- CAS Number: 176894-09-0
- PubChem CID: 3047803
- ChemSpider: 2310120
- UNII: H8YI0SSF7B
- ChEMBL: ChEMBL2105290
- CompTox Dashboard (EPA): DTXSID30170205

Chemical and physical data
- Formula: C_{27}H_{25}F_{2}NO_{4}
- Molar mass: 465.497 g·mol^{−1}
- 3D model (JSmol): Interactive image
- Density: 1.3±0.1 g/cm^{3}
- Melting point: 228.65 °C (443.57 °F)
- Boiling point: 587.2 °C (1,089.0 °F)
- Solubility in water: 0.0015 mg/mL (20 °C)
- SMILES: Fc1ccc(cc1)C(=O)CN3CC[C@H](c2ccc(F)cc2)[C@H](C3)COc4ccc5OCOc5c4
- InChI: InChI=1S/C27H25F2NO4/c28-21-5-1-18(2-6-21)24-11-12-30(15-25(31)19-3-7-22(29)8-4-19)14-20(24)16-32-23-9-10-26-27(13-23)34-17-33-26/h1-10,13,20,24H,11-12,14-17H2/t20-,24-/m1/s1; Key:FAHGZANUNVVDFL-HYBUGGRVSA-N

Omiloxetine (omiloextinum, omiloxetino INN) was a selective serotonin reuptake inhibitor drug candidate that underwent preclinical development by the Spanish pharmaceutical company, Ferrer Internacional, until 2005, when it was abandoned.

Rafael Foguet also patented Abaperidone.
