= Desmethylsibutramine =

Chemical compound

Identifiers
- IUPAC name: 1-[1-(4-chlorophenyl)cyclobutyl]-N,3-dimethylbutan-1-amine
- CAS Number: 168835-59-4
- PubChem CID: 10199199
- ChemSpider: 8374698
- UNII: 889I657R9P
- CompTox Dashboard (EPA): DTXSID701314239

Chemical and physical data
- Formula: C_{16}H_{24}ClN
- Molar mass: 265.83 g·mol^{−1}
- 3D model (JSmol): Interactive image
- SMILES: CC(C)CC(C1(CCC1)C2=CC=C(C=C2)Cl)NC
- InChI: InChI=1S/C16H24ClN/c1-12(2)11-15(18-3)16(9-4-10-16)13-5-7-14(17)8-6-13/h5-8,12,15,18H,4,9-11H2,1-3H3; Key:PLXKZKLXYHLWHR-UHFFFAOYSA-N

Desmethylsibutramine (also known as norsibutramine and BTS-54354) is an active metabolite of the anorectic drug sibutramine. It is a more potent monoamine reuptake inhibitor than sibutramine and has been sold as an ingredient in weight loss products sold as dietary supplements, along with related compounds such as the N-ethyl and 3,4-dichloro derivatives.

== See also ==
- α-PHiP
- 4-Chloro-alpha-pyrrolidinovalerophenone
- Chlorosipentramine
- Isohexylone
- Venlafaxine
