= Seproxetine =

SSRI drug and metabolite of fluoxetine

Clinical data
- ATC code: none

Legal status
- Legal status: In general: uncontrolled

Pharmacokinetic data
- Elimination half-life: 4–16 days

Identifiers
- IUPAC name: (S)-3-Phenyl-3-[4-(trifluoromethyl)phenoxy]propan-1-amine
- CAS Number: 126924-38-7
- PubChem CID: 4541
- IUPHAR/BPS: 208
- DrugBank: DB06731
- ChemSpider: 4382
- UNII: 25CO3X0R31
- CompTox Dashboard (EPA): DTXSID80866540

Chemical and physical data
- Formula: C_{16}H_{16}F_{3}NO
- Molar mass: 295.305 g·mol^{−1}

Seproxetine, also known as (S)-norfluoxetine, is a selective serotonin reuptake inhibitor (SSRI). It is the (S) enantiomer of norfluoxetine, the active metabolite of the widely used antidepressant fluoxetine; it is nearly 4 times more selective for stimulating neurosteroid synthesis relative to serotonin reuptake inhibition than fluoxetine. It is formed through the demethylation, or removal of a methyl group, of fluoxetine. Seproxetine is both an inhibitor of serotonin and dopamine transporters, 5-HT_{2A} and 5-HT_{2C} receptors. It was being investigated by Eli Lilly and Company as an antidepressant; however, it causes cardiac arrhythmia by blocking the KvLQT1 protein, which is responsible for the management of the QT interval. This is the time it takes for the heart to contract and recover. Due to this, development of the medication was discontinued. Efficacy testing found that the drug was equivalent to fluoxetine, but sixteen times more powerful than the (R) enantiomer of norfluoxetine.
