= Selective serotonin reuptake inhibitor =

Class of antidepressant medication

- Drug class
- Serotonin, the neurotransmitter that is involved in the mechanism of action of SSRIs

Class identifiers
- Synonyms: Serotonin-specific reuptake inhibitors, serotonergic antidepressants
- Use: Major depressive disorder, anxiety disorder, post-traumatic stress disorder, eating disorder, obsessive–compulsive disorder
- ATC code: N06AB
- Biological target: Serotonin transporter

Clinical data
- Drugs.com: Drug Classes
- Consumer Reports: Best Buy Drugs

External links
- MeSH: D017367

Legal status

Selective serotonin reuptake inhibitors (SSRIs) are a class of drugs that are typically used as antidepressants in the treatment of major depressive disorder, anxiety disorders, and other psychiatric conditions.

SSRIs primarily work by blocking serotonin reabsorption (reuptake) via the serotonin transporter, leading to gradual changes in brain signaling and receptor regulation, with some also interacting with sigma-1 receptors, particularly fluvoxamine, which may contribute to cognitive effects. Marketed SSRIs include six main antidepressants—citalopram, escitalopram, fluoxetine, fluvoxamine, paroxetine, and sertraline—and dapoxetine, which is indicated for premature ejaculation. Fluoxetine has been approved for veterinary use in the treatment of canine separation anxiety.

SSRIs are the most widely prescribed antidepressants in many countries. In adults, they are recommended as a first-line treatment for moderate to severe depression, while for mild depression non-drug treatments are preferred unless the patient chooses medication. A 2018 meta analysis of 21 antidepressants showed that all antidepressants (including SSRIs) were more effective than placebo in adults with major depressive disorder. However, this same meta analysis evaluated studies for risk of bias and found that 9% of studies had high risk and 73% had moderate risk. Further, "the certainty of evidence was moderate to very low."

== Medical uses ==
The main indication for SSRIs is major depressive disorder; however, they are frequently prescribed for anxiety disorders, such as social anxiety disorder, generalized anxiety disorder, panic disorder, obsessive–compulsive disorder, eating disorders, chronic pain, and, in some cases, for post-traumatic stress disorder. They are also frequently used to treat depersonalization disorder, although with varying results.

=== Depression ===
==== In adults ====
In 2022, the UK National Institute for Health and Care Excellence (NICE) recommended that antidepressants be offered as a first-line treatment for moderate to severe depression, but for mild depression, non-drug interventions are preferred unless the patient chooses medication. They recommended that antidepressants should not be routinely offered for mild depression and should generally be used only if non-drug treatments fail or the patient prefers medication. In a 2018 review, all 21 studied antidepressants were more effective than placebo for major depressive disorder.

The commonly used definition of antidepressant "response" as a 50% symptom reduction dichotomizes continuous data, which methodologists note can inflate effect sizes, exaggerate drug–placebo differences, and may not reliably indicate clinical significance. A large FDA trial analysis found that SSRIs and other antidepressants produced only modest average benefits over placebo, with about 15% of patients experiencing a substantial drug-specific response. SSRIs and other antidepressants may have average treatment effects that fall below the minimal important difference on common depression outcome measures, leaving their clinical significance in acute moderate-to-severe depression uncertain.

There is no consistent evidence that depression is caused by lowered serotonin activity or concentrations, with some data suggesting that long-term antidepressant use may reduce serotonin levels.

==== In children ====
The NICE Guideline recommends that SSRIs should not be used to treat depression in children and young people, except for fluoxetine, which may be considered for moderate to severe depression when psychological therapies alone are insufficient. In the United States, they are approved for use in pediatric patients; however, individuals under 25 years of age should be closely monitored for an increased risk of suicidality, as indicated by the FDA black box warning.

SSRIs have the best outcomes when combined with cognitive-behavioral therapy. Their benefits are modest and tolerability varies. The benefits may be clinically unimportant and there are uncertain effects on suicide risk.

=== Social anxiety disorder ===
SSRIs show some evidence of effectiveness for social anxiety disorder, including reducing relapse and disability, but the overall quality of evidence is low to moderate and tolerability is slightly lower than placebo.

=== Post-traumatic stress disorder ===
Two SSRIs are FDA-approved for PTSD: paroxetine and sertraline. The 2023 VA/DoD guideline for PTSD recommends the SSRIs sertraline and paroxetine as first-line pharmacological treatments when trauma-focused therapy is unavailable or not preferred; evidence for other SSRIs is insufficient, and medications are recommended to be tailored to each patient's individual needs. A 2022 Cochrane review found that SSRIs improve PTSD symptoms in 58% of patients compared with 35% on placebo (RR 0.66) and are considered first-line treatment.

=== Generalized anxiety disorder ===
SSRIs are recommended by the National Institute for Health and Care Excellence (NICE) for the treatment of generalized anxiety disorder (GAD) in adults who have not responded to initial interventions such as education, self-help strategies, or psychological therapies.

SSRIs are more effective than placebo for treating GAD with similar overall acceptability, though they increase dropout due to adverse effects.

=== Obsessive–compulsive disorder ===
In Canada, SSRIs are a first-line treatment of adult obsessive–compulsive disorder (OCD). In the UK, they are first-line treatment only with moderate to severe functional impairment and as second-line treatment for those with mild impairment, though, as of early 2019, this recommendation is being reviewed.

SSRIs are more effective than placebo for reducing OCD symptoms and global severity in children and adolescents, and combining them with exposure therapy is probably more effective than using an SSRI alone.

=== Panic disorder ===
SSRIs are approved to treat panic disorder. SSRIs may be more effective than placebo in reducing panic disorder symptoms, but they are associated with a higher risk of adverse effects and may be less well tolerated.

=== Eating disorders ===
Antidepressants are recommended as an alternative or additional first step to self-help programs in the treatment of bulimia nervosa. SSRIs (fluoxetine in particular) are preferred over other anti-depressants due to their acceptability, tolerability, and superior reduction of symptoms in short-term trials. Long-term efficacy remains poorly characterized.

Similar recommendations apply to binge eating disorder. SSRIs provide short-term reductions in binge eating behavior, but have not been associated with significant weight loss.

Clinical trials have generated mostly negative results for the use of SSRIs in the treatment of anorexia nervosa. Treatment guidelines from the National Institute of Health and Clinical Excellence recommend against the use of SSRIs in this disorder. Those from the American Psychiatric Association note that SSRIs confer no advantage regarding weight gain, but that they may be used for the treatment of co-existing depression, anxiety, or OCD.

=== Stroke recovery ===
SSRIs have been used off-label in the treatment of stroke patients, including those with and without symptoms of depression. A 2021 meta-analysis of randomized controlled clinical trials found no evidence pointing to their routine use to promote recovery following stroke. A 2022 meta-analysis of randomized controlled trials suggested that citalopram could improve dependence, motor ability, and cognitive function in stroke patients, without similar findings for fluoxetine.

=== Premature ejaculation ===
SSRIs are effective for the treatment of premature ejaculation. Taking SSRIs on a chronic, daily basis is more effective than taking them prior to sexual activity. The increased efficacy of treatment when taking SSRIs on a daily basis is consistent with clinical observations that the therapeutic effects of SSRIs generally take several weeks to emerge. Sexual dysfunction ranging from decreased libido to anorgasmia is usually considered to be a significantly distressing side effect which may lead to noncompliance in patients receiving SSRIs. However, for those with premature ejaculation, this same side effect becomes the desired effect.

=== Other uses ===
SSRIs such as sertraline are effective in decreasing anger, and fluoxetine has been proven effective in reduction of attack frequency and intensity for Raynaud syndrome.

== Side effects ==
Side effects vary among the individual drugs of this class. They may include akathisia.

=== Sexual dysfunction ===
SSRIs can cause various types of sexual dysfunction such as anorgasmia, erectile dysfunction, diminished libido, genital numbness, and sexual anhedonia (pleasureless orgasm). Sexual problems are common with SSRIs. Poor sexual function is one of the most common reasons people stop the medication.

The mechanism by which SSRIs may cause sexual side effects is not well understood as of 2021. The range of possible mechanisms includes (1) nonspecific neurological effects (e.g., sedation) that globally impair behavior including sexual function; (2) specific effects on brain systems mediating sexual function; (3) specific effects on peripheral tissues and organs, such as the penis, that mediate sexual function; and (4) direct or indirect effects on hormones mediating sexual function. Management strategies include: for erectile dysfunction the addition of a PDE5 inhibitor such as sildenafil; for decreased libido, possibly adding or switching to bupropion; and for overall sexual dysfunction, switching to nefazodone. Buspirone is sometimes used off-label to reduce sexual dysfunction associated with the use of SSRIs.

A number of non-SSRI drugs are not associated with sexual side effects (such as bupropion, mirtazapine, tianeptine, agomelatine, tranylcypromine, and moclobemide).

Several studies have suggested that SSRIs may adversely affect semen quality.

While trazodone (an antidepressant with alpha adrenergic receptor blockade) is a notorious cause of priapism, cases of priapism have also been reported with certain SSRIs (e.g., fluoxetine, citalopram).

==== Post-SSRI sexual dysfunction ====
Post-SSRI sexual dysfunction (PSSD) refers to a set of symptoms reported by some people who have taken SSRIs or other serotonin reuptake-inhibiting (SRI) drugs, in which sexual dysfunction symptoms persist for at least three months after ceasing to take the drug. The status of PSSD as a legitimate and distinct pathology is contentious; several researchers have proposed that it be recognized as a separate phenomenon from more common SSRI side effects.

The reported symptoms of PSSD include reduced sexual desire or arousal, erectile dysfunction in males or loss of vaginal lubrication in females, persistent premature ejaculation (even in patients without a previous history of the condition), difficulty having an orgasm or loss of pleasurable sensation associated with orgasm, and a reduction or loss of sensitivity in the genitals or other erogenous zones. Additional non-sexual symptoms are also commonly described, including emotional numbing, anhedonia, depersonalization or derealization, and cognitive impairment. The duration of PSSD symptoms appears to vary among patients, with some cases resolving in months and others in years or decades; one analysis of patient reports submitted between 1992 and 2021 in the Netherlands listed a case which had reportedly persisted for 23 years. The symptoms of PSSD are largely shared with post-finasteride syndrome and post-retinoid sexual dysfunction, two other poorly understood conditions which have been suggested to share a common etiology with PSSD despite being associated with different types of medication.

Diagnostic criteria for PSSD were proposed in 2022, but as of 2023, there is no agreement on standards for diagnosis. It is a distinct phenomenon from antidepressant discontinuation syndrome, post-acute withdrawal syndrome, and major depressive disorder, and should be distinguished from sexual dysfunction associated with depression and persistent genital arousal disorder. There are limited treatment options for PSSD as of 2023 and no evidence that any individual approach is effective. The mechanism by which SSRIs may induce PSSD is unclear. However, various neurochemical, hormonal, and biochemical changes during SSRI use—such as reduced dopamine levels, increased serotonin, inhibition of nitric oxide synthase, and the blocking of cholinergic and alpha-1 adrenergic receptors—could account for their sexual adverse effects. Additionally, SSRIs may cause peripheral changes by inhibiting serotonin receptors in peripheral nerves, which may also play a role in PSSD. As of 2023, prevalence is unknown. A 2020 review stated that PSSD is rare, underreported, and "increasingly identified in online communities". A 19 year retrospective analysis looking at people with erectile dysfunction who met most of the criteria for PSSD found that the estimated risk was 0.46%. This study was only looking at people who have erectile dysfunction. This limitation makes it difficult to obtain a true figure as people who took SSRIs and did not have erectile dysfunction were not included.

Reports of PSSD have occurred with almost every SSRI (dapoxetine is an exception). In 2019, the Pharmacovigilance Risk Assessment Committee of the European Medicines Agency (EMA) recommended that packaging leaflets of selected SSRIs and SNRIs should be amended to include information regarding a possible risk of persistent sexual dysfunction. Following the EMA assessment, a safety review by Health Canada "could neither confirm nor rule out a causal link ... which was long lasting in rare cases", but recommended that "healthcare professionals inform patients about the potential risk of long-lasting sexual dysfunction despite discontinuation of treatment". A 2023 review stated that ongoing sexual dysfunction after SSRI discontinuation was possible, but that cause and effect were undetermined. The 2023 review cautioned that reports of sexual dysfunction cannot be generalized to wider practice as they are subject to a "high risk of bias", but agreed with the EMA assessment that cautionary labeling on SSRIs was warranted.

On May 20, 2024, a lawsuit was filed by the organization Public Citizen, representing Dr. Antonei Csoka, against the United States Food and Drug Administration (FDA) for failing to act on a citizen petition submitted in 2018. The petition seeks to have the risk of serious sexual side effects persisting after discontinuation mentioned in the product labels of SSRIs and SNRIs. The lawsuit was dismissed by the United States District Court for the District of Columbia on March 25, 2025, due to the plaintiff lacking legal standing, as the court found no specific informational or physical injury. The FDA has not mandated comprehensive PSSD warnings across all SSRI and SNRI labels, though fluoxetine (Prozac) has included a warning about persistent sexual side effects since 2011. Most other SSRI and SNRI labels address sexual dysfunction during use but not explicitly after discontinuation.

=== Emotional blunting ===
Certain antidepressants may cause emotional blunting, characterized by reduced intensity of both positive and negative emotions as well as symptoms of apathy, indifference, and amotivation. It may be experienced as either beneficial or detrimental depending on the situation. Higher doses of antidepressants seem to be more likely to produce emotional blunting than lower doses. It can be decreased by reducing dosage, discontinuing the medication, or switching to a different antidepressant that may have less propensity for causing this side effect. Specifically, this side effect has been particularly associated with serotonergic antidepressants like SSRIs and SNRIs and may be less with atypical antidepressants like bupropion, agomelatine, and vortioxetine. In addition, whereas the SSRI escitalopram was associated with emotional blunting, the serotonergic psychedelic psilocybin did not cause such side effects and instead was associated with emotional reactivation. Such psychedelic therapies may have future potential for addressing emotional blunting in those with depression.

Confounding the understanding of emotional blunting is the fact that the same symptom can be caused by depression itself, and may instead be a sign of incomplete resolution of depression. However, there is a large amount of subjective evidence showing that it is increasingly reported after starting the use of antidepressants, suggesting that antidepressants do induce emotional blunting. There does appear to be a positive correlation between depression symptoms (measured by HAD-D) and degree of emotional blunting (measured by OQuESA), but more research is needed to clarify how much depression may contribute to this symptom. One possible explanation of this side effect of SSRIs and SNRIs is that they decrease the resting-state functional connectivity of the dorsal medial prefrontal cortex.

As many as one-third of patients experiencing emotional blunting do not report it as a side effect to their physician.

=== Vision ===
Acute narrow-angle glaucoma is the most common and important ocular side effect of SSRIs, and often goes misdiagnosed.

=== Cardiac ===
SSRIs do not appear to affect the risk of coronary heart disease (CHD) in those without a previous diagnosis of CHD. A large cohort study suggested no substantial increase in the risk of cardiac malformations attributable to SSRI usage during the first trimester of pregnancy. A number of large studies of people without known pre-existing heart disease have reported no EKG changes related to SSRI use. The recommended maximum daily dose of citalopram and escitalopram was reduced due to concerns with QT prolongation. In overdose, fluoxetine has been reported to cause sinus tachycardia, myocardial infarction, junctional rhythms, and trigeminy. Some authors have suggested electrocardiographic monitoring in patients with severe pre-existing cardiovascular disease who are taking SSRIs.

In a 2023 study, a possible connection between SSRI usage and the onset of mitral valve regurgitation was identified, indicating that SSRIs could hasten the progression of degenerative mitral valve regurgitation (DMR), especially in individuals carrying 5-HTTLPR genotype. The study's authors suggest that genotyping should be performed on people with DMR to evaluate serotonin transporter (SERT) activity. They also urge practitioners to exercise caution when prescribing SSRIs to individuals with a familial history of DMR.

=== Bleeding ===
SSRIs directly increase the risk of abnormal bleeding by lowering platelet serotonin levels, which are essential to platelet-driven hemostasis. SSRIs interact with anticoagulants, like warfarin, and antiplatelet drugs, like aspirin. This includes an increased risk of GI bleeding, and post operative bleeding. The relative risk of intracranial bleeding is increased, but the absolute risk is low. SSRIs are known to cause platelet dysfunction. This risk is greater in those who are also on anticoagulants, antiplatelet agents and NSAIDs (nonsteroidal anti-inflammatory drugs), as well as with the co-existence of underlying diseases such as cirrhosis of the liver or liver failure.

=== Fracture risk ===
Evidence from longitudinal, cross-sectional, and prospective cohort studies suggests an association between SSRI usage at therapeutic doses and a decrease in bone mineral density, as well as increased fracture risk, a relationship that appears to persist even with adjuvant bisphosphonate therapy. However, because the relationship between SSRIs and fractures is based on observational data as opposed to prospective trials, the phenomenon is not definitively causal. There also appears to be an increase in fracture-inducing falls with SSRI use, suggesting the need for increased attention to fall risk in elderly patients using the medication. The loss of bone density does not appear to occur in younger patients taking SSRIs.

=== Bruxism ===
SSRI and SNRI antidepressants may cause jaw pain/jaw spasm reversible syndrome (although it is not common). Buspirone appears to be successful in treating bruxism on SSRI/SNRI induced jaw clenching.

=== Serotonin syndrome ===
Serotonin syndrome is typically caused by the use of two or more serotonergic drugs, including SSRIs. Serotonin syndrome is a condition that can range from mild (most common) to deadly. Mild symptoms may consist of increased heart rate, fever, shivering, sweating, dilated pupils, myoclonus (intermittent jerking or twitching), as well as hyperreflexia. Concomitant use of SSRIs or SNRIs for depression with a triptan for migraine does not appear to heighten the risk of the serotonin syndrome. Taking monoamine oxidase inhibitors (MAOIs) in combination with SSRIs can be fatal, since MAOIs disrupt monoamine oxidase, an enzyme which is needed to break down serotonin and other neurotransmitters. Without monoamine oxidase, the body is unable to eliminate excess neurotransmitters, allowing them to build up to dangerous levels. The prognosis for recovery in a hospital setting is generally good if serotonin syndrome is correctly identified. Treatment consists of discontinuing any serotonergic drugs and providing supportive care to manage agitation and hyperthermia, usually with benzodiazepines.

=== Suicide risk ===
==== Children and adolescents ====
Meta-analyses of short-duration randomized clinical trials have found that SSRI use is related to a higher risk of suicidal behavior in children and adolescents. For instance, a 2004 U.S. Food and Drug Administration (FDA) analysis of clinical trials on children with major depressive disorder found statistically significant increases of the risks of "possible suicidal ideation and suicidal behavior" by about 80%, and of agitation and hostility by about 130%. According to the FDA, the heightened risk of suicidality is within the first one to two months of treatment. The National Institute for Health and Care Excellence (NICE) places the excess risk in the "early stages of treatment", "particularly in the early weeks of treatment". The European Psychiatric Association places the excess risk in the first two weeks of treatment and, based on a combination of epidemiological, prospective cohort, medical claims, and randomized clinical trial data, concludes that a protective effect dominates after this early period. A 2014 Cochrane review found that at six to nine months, suicidal ideation remained higher in children treated with antidepressants compared to those treated with psychological therapy.

In 2004, the Medicines and Healthcare products Regulatory Agency (MHRA) in the United Kingdom judged fluoxetine (Prozac) to be the only antidepressant that offered a favorable risk-benefit ratio in children with depression, though it was also associated with a slight increase in the risk of self-harm and suicidal ideation. Only two SSRIs are licensed for use with children in the UK, sertraline (Zoloft) and fluvoxamine (Luvox), for the treatment of obsessive–compulsive disorder. Fluoxetine is not licensed for this use.

A 2007 comparison of aggression and hostility occurring during treatment with fluoxetine to placebo in children and adolescents found that no significant difference between the fluoxetine group and the placebo group. There is also evidence that higher rates of SSRI prescriptions are associated with lower rates of suicide in children, though since the evidence is correlational, the true nature of the relationship is unclear. A 2021 Swedish study, using a within-individual design, also found that young people (as well as adults) who have both attempted suicide and been prescribed SSRIs most commonly make the attempt before, rather than after, starting their SSRI prescription.

==== Adults ====
It is unclear whether SSRIs affect the risk of suicidal behavior in adults.

- A 2005 meta-analysis of drug company data found no evidence that SSRIs increased the risk of suicide; however, important protective or hazardous effects could not be excluded.
- A 2005 review observed that suicide attempts are increased in those who use SSRIs as compared to placebo and compared to therapeutic interventions other than tricyclic antidepressants. No difference risk of suicide attempts was detected between SSRIs versus tricyclic antidepressants.
- A 2006 review suggests that the widespread use of antidepressants in the new "SSRI-era" appears to have led to a highly significant decline in suicide rates in most countries with traditionally high baseline suicide rates. The decline is particularly striking for women who, compared with men, seek more help for depression. Recent clinical data on large samples in the US, too, have revealed a protective effect of antidepressants against suicide.
- A 2006 meta-analysis of randomized controlled trials suggests that SSRIs increase suicide ideation compared with placebo. However, the observational studies suggest that SSRIs did not increase suicide risk more than older antidepressants. The researchers stated that if SSRIs increase suicide risk in some patients, the number of additional deaths is small because ecological studies have generally found that suicide mortality has declined (or at least not increased) as SSRI use has increased.
- An additional meta-analysis by the FDA in 2006 found an age-related effect of SSRIs. Among adults younger than 25 years, results indicated that there was a higher risk for suicidal behavior. For adults between 25 and 64, the effect appears neutral on suicidal behavior, but possibly protective for suicidal behavior for adults between the ages of 25 and 64. For adults older than 64, SSRIs seem to reduce the risk of suicidal behavior.
- In 2016, a review criticized the effects of the FDA Black Box suicide warning inclusion in the prescription. The authors discussed that the suicide rates might also increase as a consequence of the warning. A 2019 review makes a similar claim, noting that instead of increasing the use of psychotherapy (as the FDA had hoped), the warning has increased the use of benzodiazepines.
- A 2021 study on Swedish youth and adults between 2006 and 2013 (n = 538,577) finds that the highest frequency of suicides occurs at 30 days before, rather than after, the beginning of SSRI prescription. This pattern indicates that SSRIs do not increase the risk of suicide and may reduce the risk.

=== Risk of death ===
A 2017 meta-analysis found that antidepressants, including SSRIs, were associated with significantly increased risk of death (+33%) and new cardiovascular complications (+14%) in the general population. Conversely, risks were not greater in people with existing cardiovascular disease.

=== Pregnancy and breastfeeding ===
SSRI use in pregnancy has been associated with a variety of risks with varying degrees of proof of causation. As depression is independently associated with negative pregnancy outcomes, determining the extent to which observed associations between antidepressant use and specific adverse outcomes reflect a causative relationship has been difficult in some cases. In other cases, the attribution of adverse outcomes to antidepressant exposure seems fairly clear.

SSRI use in pregnancy is associated with an increased risk of spontaneous abortion of about 1.7-fold. Use is also associated with preterm birth. According to some researches, decreased body weight of the child, intrauterine growth retardation, neonatal adaptive syndrome, and persistent pulmonary hypertension also was noted.

A systematic review of the risk of major birth defects in antidepressant-exposed pregnancies found a small increase (3% to 24%) in the risk of major malformations and a risk of cardiovascular birth defects that did not differ from non-exposed pregnancies. Other studies have found an increased risk of cardiovascular birth defects among depressed mothers not undergoing SSRI treatment, suggesting the possibility of ascertainment bias, e.g. that worried mothers may pursue more aggressive testing of their infants. Another study found no increase in cardiovascular birth defects and a 27% increased risk of major malformations in SSRI-exposed pregnancies.

The FDA stated on July 19, 2006, that nursing mothers on SSRIs must discuss treatment with their physicians. However, the medical literature on the safety of SSRIs has determined that some SSRIs, like Sertraline and Paroxetine, are considered safe for breastfeeding.

=== Neonatal abstinence syndrome ===
Several studies have documented neonatal abstinence syndrome, a syndrome of neurological, gastrointestinal, autonomic, endocrine, or respiratory symptoms among a large minority of infants with intrauterine exposure. These syndromes are short-lived, but insufficient long-term data are available to determine whether there are long-term effects.

==== Persistent pulmonary hypertension ====
Persistent pulmonary hypertension (PPHN) is a serious and life-threatening, but very rare, lung condition that occurs soon after the birth of the newborn. Newborn babies with PPHN have high pressure in their lung blood vessels and are not able to get enough oxygen into their bloodstream. About 1 to 2 babies per 1000 babies born in the U.S. develop PPHN shortly after birth, and often they need intensive medical care. It is associated with about a 25% risk of significant long-term neurological deficits. A 2014 meta analysis found no increased risk of persistent pulmonary hypertension associated with exposure to SSRIs in early pregnancy and a slight increase in risk associates with exposure late in pregnancy; "an estimated 286 to 351 women would need to be treated with an SSRI in late pregnancy to result in an average of one additional case of persistent pulmonary hypertension of the newborn". A review published in 2012 reached conclusions similar to those of the 2014 study.

==== Neuropsychiatric effects in offspring ====
According to a 2015 review available data found that "some signal exists suggesting that antenatal exposure to SSRIs may increase the risk of ASDs (autism spectrum disorders)" even though a large cohort study published in 2013 and a cohort study using data from Finland's national register between 1996 and 2010 and published in 2016 found no significant association between SSRI use and autism in offspring. The 2016 Finland study also found no association with ADHD, but did find an association with increased rates of depression diagnoses in early adolescence.

=== Bipolar switch ===
In adults and children with bipolar disorder, SSRIs may cause a bipolar switch from depression into hypomania/mania, mixed states, or rapid cycling. When taken with mood stabilizers, the risk of switching is not increased; however, when taking SSRIs as a monotherapy, the risk of switching may be twice or three times that of the average. The changes are not often easy to detect and require monitoring by family and mental health professionals. This switch might happen even with no prior (hypo)manic episodes and might therefore not be foreseen by the psychiatrist.

In addition to causing a switch from depression to mania, antidepressants may also cause rapid switches between mood states, known as rapid cycling. Some types of antidepressants are more likely to cause a manic switch or rapid cycling. Serotonin-norepinephrine reuptake inhibitors such as venlafaxine or duloxetine, tetracyclic antidepressants such as mirtazapine, or older tricyclic antidepressants are more likely than SSRIs or bupropion to cause manic switches or rapid cycling. Atypical antipsychotics are approved for bipolar depression. The FDA has approved lurasidone, quetiapine, olanzapine/fluoxetine combination, cariprazine, and lumateperone for bipolar depression.

== Interactions ==
The following drugs may precipitate serotonin syndrome in people on SSRIs:

- Linezolid
- Monoamine oxidase inhibitors (MAOIs) including moclobemide, phenelzine, tranylcypromine, selegiline and methylene blue
- Lithium
- Sibutramine
- MDMA (ecstasy)
- Dextromethorphan
- Tramadol
- 5-HTP
- Pethidine/meperidine
- St. John's wort
- Yohimbe
- Tricyclic antidepressants (TCAs)
- Serotonin-norepinephrine reuptake inhibitors (SNRIs)
- Buspirone
- Triptan
- Mirtazapine

Painkillers of the NSAIDs drug family may interfere and reduce efficiency of SSRIs and may compound the increased risk of gastrointestinal bleeds caused by SSRI use. NSAIDs include:

- Aspirin
- Ibuprofen (Advil, Nurofen)
- Naproxen (Aleve)

There are several potential pharmacokinetic interactions between the various individual SSRIs and other medications. Most of these arise from the fact that every SSRI can inhibit certain P450 cytochrome enzymes.

Cytochrome P450 enzyme inhibition by SSRIs
Drug name	CYP1A2	CYP2C9	CYP2C19	CYP2D6	CYP3A4	CYP2B6
Citalopram	+	0	0	+	0	0
Escitalopram	0	0	0	+	0	0
Fluoxetine	+	++	+/++	+++	+	+
Fluvoxamine	+++	++	+++	+	+	+
Paroxetine	+	+	+	+++	+	+++
Sertraline	+	+	+/++	+	+	+

Legend:
0 – no inhibition
+ – mild/weak inhibition
++ – moderate inhibition
+++ – strong/potent inhibition

The CYP2D6 enzyme is entirely responsible for the metabolism of hydrocodone, codeine and dihydrocodeine to their active metabolites (hydromorphone, morphine, and dihydromorphine, respectively), which in turn undergo phase 2 glucuronidation. These opioids (and to a lesser extent oxycodone, tramadol, and methadone) have interaction potential with selective serotonin reuptake inhibitors. The concomitant use of some SSRIs (paroxetine and fluoxetine) with codeine may decrease the plasma concentration of active metabolite morphine, which may result in reduced analgesic efficacy.

Another important interaction of certain SSRIs involves paroxetine, a potent inhibitor of CYP2D6, and tamoxifen, an agent commonly used in the treatment and prevention of breast cancer. Tamoxifen is a prodrug that is metabolised by the hepatic cytochrome P450 enzyme system, especially CYP2D6, to its active metabolites. Concomitant use of paroxetine and tamoxifen in women with breast cancer is associated with a higher risk of death, as much as a 91 percent increase in women who used it the longest.

== Overdose ==
SSRIs appear safer in overdose when compared with traditional antidepressants, such as the tricyclic antidepressants. This relative safety is supported by both case series and studies of deaths per number of prescriptions. However, case reports of SSRI poisoning have indicated that severe toxicity can occur and deaths have been reported following massive single ingestions, although this is exceedingly uncommon when compared to the tricyclic antidepressants.

Because of the wide therapeutic index of the SSRIs, most patients will have mild or no symptoms following moderate overdoses. The most commonly reported severe effect following SSRI overdose is serotonin syndrome; serotonin toxicity is usually associated with massive overdoses or multiple drug ingestion. Other reported significant effects include coma, seizures, and cardiac toxicity.

Poisoning is also known in animals, and some toxicity information is available for veterinary treatment.

== Discontinuation syndrome ==
Abrupt discontinuation of SSRIs, especially after prolonged therapy, causes a withdrawal syndrome, which may include symptoms such as nausea and vomiting, headache, dizziness, chills, body aches, paresthesias, insomnia, and brain zaps. Serotonin reuptake inhibitors should not be abruptly discontinued after extended therapy, and whenever possible, should be tapered over several weeks to minimize discontinuation-related symptoms. SSRI-associated withdrawal symptoms are not typically referred to as a dependence syndrome. However, commentators have noted that such symptoms meet the definition of a physical and psychological dependence syndrome.

Paroxetine may produce discontinuation-related symptoms at a greater rate than other SSRIs, though qualitatively similar effects have been reported for all SSRIs. Discontinuation effects appear to be less for fluoxetine, perhaps owing to its long half-life and the natural tapering effect associated with its slow clearance from the body. One strategy for minimizing SSRI discontinuation symptoms is to switch the patient to fluoxetine and then taper and discontinue the fluoxetine.

== Mechanism of action ==
=== Serotonin reuptake inhibition ===
All SSRIs block the reuptake of serotonin through the serotonin transporter (SERT). This occurs in various anatomical sites, including the presynaptic terminals of serotonergic neurons in the central and peripheral nervous systems, enteric neurons and epithelial cells in the gastrointestinal tract, the pulmonary endothelium, and platelets.

In the central nervous system, the majority of released serotonin is taken up by SERT. When this process is blocked, it stays in the synaptic gap longer than it normally would, and may repeatedly stimulate the receptors of the postsynaptic cell. In the short run, this leads to an increase in signaling across synapses in which serotonin is the primary neurotransmitter. On chronic dosing, the increased occupancy of post-synaptic serotonin receptors signals the pre-synaptic neuron to synthesize and release less serotonin. Serotonin levels within the synapse drop, then rise again, ultimately leading to downregulation of post-synaptic serotonin receptors. Other, indirect effects may include increased norepinephrine output, increased neuronal cyclic AMP levels, and increased levels of regulatory factors such as BDNF and CREB.

=== Sigma receptor ligands ===
SSRIs at the human SERT and rat sigma receptors
Medication	SERT	σ_{1}		σ_{2}	σ_{1} / SERT
Citalopram	1.16	292–404	Agonist	5,410	252–348
Escitalopram	2.5	288	Agonist	ND	ND
Fluoxetine	0.81	191–240	Agonist	16,100	296–365
Fluvoxamine	2.2	17–36	Agonist	8,439	7.7–16.4
Paroxetine	0.13	≥1,893	ND	22,870	≥14,562
Sertraline	0.29	32–57	Antagonist	5,297	110–197
Values are K_{i} (nM). The smaller the value, the more strongly the drug binds to the site.

In addition to their actions as reuptake inhibitors of serotonin, some SSRIs are also, coincidentally, ligands of the sigma receptors. Fluvoxamine is an agonist of the σ_{1} receptor, while sertraline is an antagonist of the σ_{1} receptor, and paroxetine does not significantly interact with the σ_{1} receptor. None of the SSRIs have significant affinity for the σ_{2} receptor. Fluvoxamine has by far the strongest activity of the SSRIs at the σ_{1} receptor. High occupancy of the σ_{1} receptor by clinical dosages of fluvoxamine has been observed in the human brain in positron emission tomography (PET) research. Agonism of the σ_{1} receptor by fluvoxamine may have beneficial effects on cognition. In contrast to fluvoxamine, the relevance of the σ_{1} receptor in the actions of the other SSRIs is uncertain and questionable due to their low affinity for the receptor relative to the SERT.

=== Anti-inflammatory effects ===
The role of inflammation and the immune system in depression has been extensively studied. The evidence supporting this link has been shown in numerous studies over the past decade. Nationwide studies and meta-analyses of smaller cohort studies have uncovered a correlation between pre-existing inflammatory conditions such as type 1 diabetes, rheumatoid arthritis (RA), or hepatitis, and an increased risk of depression. Data also shows that using pro-inflammatory agents in the treatment of diseases like melanoma can lead to depression. Several meta-analytical studies have found increased levels of proinflammatory cytokines and chemokines in depressed patients. This link has led scientists to investigate the effects of antidepressants on the immune system.

SSRIs were originally invented to increase levels of available serotonin in the extracellular spaces. However, the delayed response between when patients first begin SSRI treatment to when they see effects has led scientists to believe that other molecules are involved in the efficacy of these drugs. To investigate the apparent anti-inflammatory effects of SSRIs, both Kohler et al. and Więdłocha et al. conducted meta-analyses which have shown that after antidepressant treatment the levels of cytokines associated with inflammation are decreased. A large cohort study conducted by researchers in the Netherlands investigated the association between depressive disorders, symptoms, and antidepressants with inflammation. The study showed decreased levels of interleukin (IL)-6, a cytokine that has proinflammatory effects, in patients taking SSRIs compared to non-medicated patients.

Treatment with SSRIs has shown reduced production of inflammatory cytokines such as IL-1β, tumor necrosis factor (TNF)-α, IL-6, and interferon (IFN)-γ, which leads to a decrease in inflammation levels and subsequently a decrease in the activation level of the immune response. These inflammatory cytokines have been shown to activate microglia, which are specialized macrophages that reside in the brain. Macrophages are a subset of immune cells responsible for host defense in the innate immune system. Macrophages can release cytokines and other chemicals to cause an inflammatory response. Peripheral inflammation can induce an inflammatory response in microglia and can cause neuroinflammation. SSRIs inhibit proinflammatory cytokine production, which leads to less activation of microglia and peripheral macrophages. SSRIs inhibit the production of these proinflammatory cytokines and have also been shown to upregulate anti-inflammatory cytokines such as IL-10. Taken together, this reduces the overall inflammatory immune response.

In addition to affecting cytokine production, there is evidence that treatment with SSRIs has effects on the proliferation and viability of immune system cells involved in both innate and adaptive immunity. Evidence shows that SSRIs can inhibit proliferation in T-cells, which are important cells for adaptive immunity, and can induce inflammation. SSRIs can also induce apoptosis, programmed cell death, in T-cells. The full mechanism of action for the anti-inflammatory effects of SSRIs is not fully known. However, there is evidence for various pathways to have a hand in the mechanism. One such possible mechanism is the increased levels of cyclic adenosine monophosphate (cAMP) as a result of interference with activation of protein kinase A (PKA), a cAMP-dependent protein. Other possible pathways include interference with calcium ion channels, or inducing cell death pathways like MAPK and Notch signaling pathway.

The anti-inflammatory effects of SSRIs have prompted studies of the efficacy of SSRIs in the treatment of autoimmune diseases such as multiple sclerosis, RA, inflammatory bowel diseases, and septic shock. These studies have been performed in animal models but have shown consistent immune regulatory effects. Fluoxetine, an SSRI, has also shown efficacy in animal models of graft vs. host disease. SSRIs have also been used successfully as pain relievers in patients undergoing oncology treatment. The effectiveness of this has been hypothesized to be at least in part due to the anti-inflammatory effects of SSRIs.

=== Pharmacogenetics ===
Large bodies of research are devoted to using genetic markers to predict whether patients will respond to SSRIs or have side effects that will cause their discontinuation, although these tests are not yet ready for widespread clinical use.

=== Versus TCAs ===
There appears to be no significant difference in effectiveness between SSRIs and tricyclic antidepressants, which were the most commonly used class of antidepressants before the development of SSRIs. However, SSRIs have the important advantage that their toxic dose is high, and, therefore, they are much more difficult to use as a means to commit suicide. Further, they have fewer and milder side effects. Tricyclic antidepressants also have a higher risk of serious cardiovascular side effects, which SSRIs lack.

SSRIs act on signal pathways such as cyclic adenosine monophosphate (cAMP) on the postsynaptic neuronal cell, which leads to the release of brain-derived neurotrophic factor (BDNF). BDNF enhances the growth and survival of cortical neurons and synapses.

== Pharmacokinetics ==
SSRIs vary in their pharmacokinetic properties.

Comparative pharmacokinetics of SSRIs
SSRI	F (%)	V_{d} (L/kg)	logP	PPB (%)	Major metabolic enzymes (additional)	t_{1/2} (h)	Dose (mg)	Levels (ng/mL)
Citalopram	80	12	3.76	80	CYP2C19, CYP3A4 (CYP2D6)	35	20–40	50–110
Escitalopram	80	12	3.5	56	CYP3A4, CYP2C19	27–32	10–20	15–80
Fluoxetine	60–80	20–45	4.05	95	CYP2D6, CYP2C9 (CYP2C19)	24–96	20–60	120–500
Fluvoxamine	53	25	2.89	77	CYP2D6 (CYP1A2)	12–15	50–300	60–230
Paroxetine	50–90	17	3.6	95	CYP2D6	21	20–50	30–120
Sertraline	80–95	20	5.1	98	CYP2B6 (CYP2C19, CYP3A4, CYP2D6)	25–26	50–200	10–150

== List of SSRIs ==
=== Marketed ===
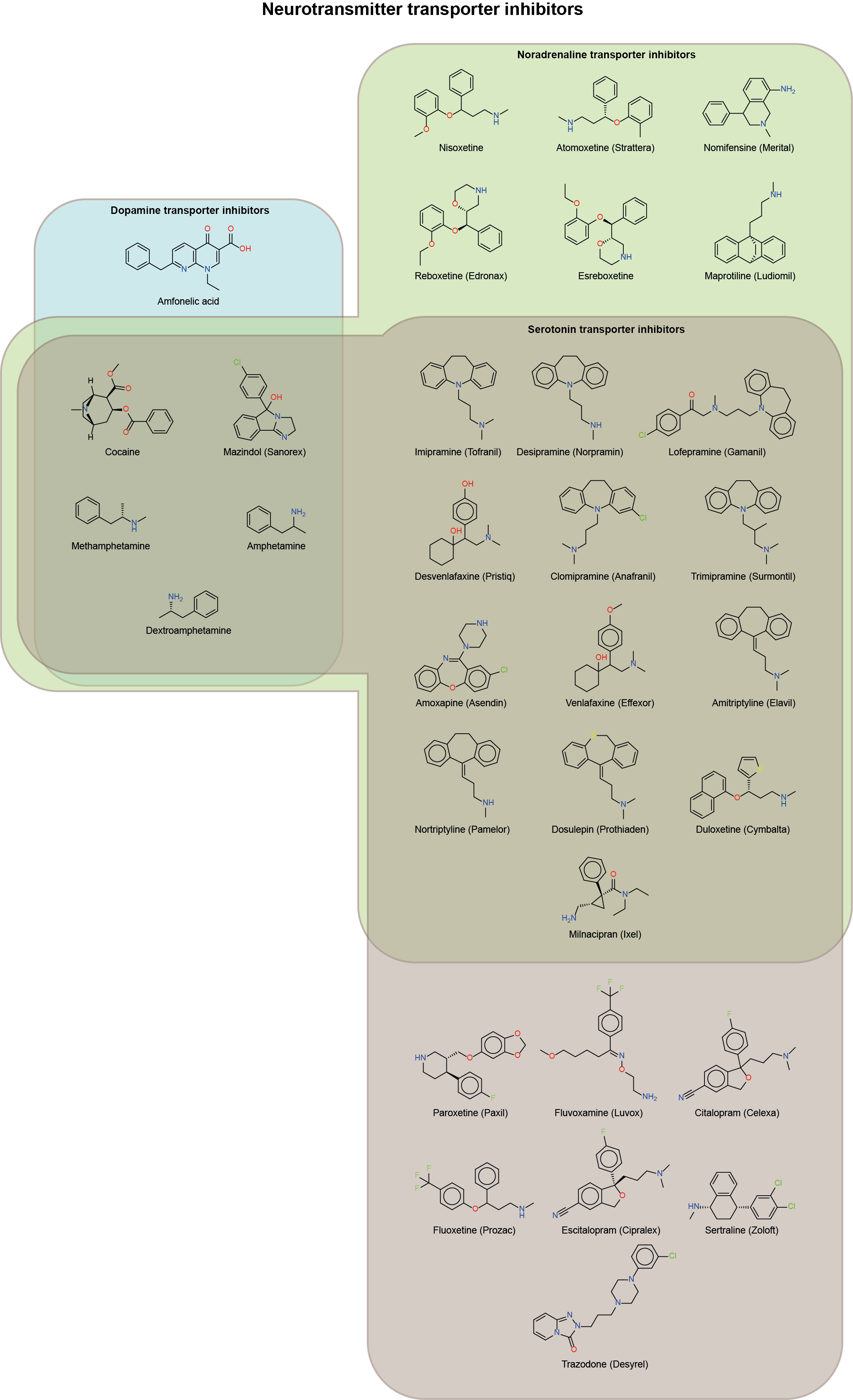
Neurotransmitter transporters inhibitors Serotonin transporter inhibitors

==== Antidepressants ====
- Citalopram (Celexa)
- Escitalopram (Lexapro)
- Fluoxetine (Prozac)
- Fluvoxamine (Luvox)
- Paroxetine (Paxil)
- Sertraline (Zoloft)
Structures

Citalopram	Escitalopram	Fluoxetine	Fluvoxamine	Paroxetine	Sertraline

==== Others ====
- Dapoxetine (Priligy)
Structures

Dapoxetine

=== Discontinued ===
==== Antidepressants ====
- Indalpine (Upstène)
- Zimelidine (Zelmid)
Structures

Indalpine	Zimelidine

=== Never marketed ===
==== Antidepressants ====
- Alaproclate (GEA-654)
- Centpropazine
- Cericlamine (JO-1017)
- Femoxetine (Malexil; FG-4963)
- Ifoxetine (CGP-15210)
- Omiloxetine
- Panuramine (WY-26002)
- Pirandamine (AY-23713)
- Seproxetine ((S)-norfluoxetine)
Structures

Alaproclate	Cericlamine	Femoxetine	Ifoxetine	Omiloxetine	Panuramine	Pirandamine	Seproxetine

=== Related drugs ===
Although described as SNRIs, duloxetine (Cymbalta), venlafaxine (Effexor), and desvenlafaxine (Pristiq) are in fact relatively selective as serotonin reuptake inhibitors (SRIs). They are about at least 10-fold selective for inhibition of serotonin reuptake over norepinephrine reuptake. The selectivity ratios are approximately 1:30 for venlafaxine, 1:10 for duloxetine, and 1:14 for desvenlafaxine. At low doses, these SNRIs act mostly as SSRIs; only at higher doses do they also prominently inhibit norepinephrine reuptake. Milnacipran (Ixel, Savella) and its stereoisomer levomilnacipran (Fetzima) are the only widely marketed SNRIs that inhibit serotonin and norepinephrine to similar degrees, both with ratios close to 1:1.

Vilazodone (Viibryd) and vortioxetine (Trintellix) are SRIs that also act as modulators of serotonin receptors and are described as serotonin modulators and stimulators (SMS). Vilazodone is a 5-HT_{1A} receptor partial agonist while vortioxetine is a 5-HT_{1A} receptor agonist and 5-HT_{3} and 5-HT_{7} receptor antagonist. Litoxetine (SL 81–0385) and lubazodone (YM-992, YM-35995) are similar drugs that were never marketed. They are SRIs and litoxetine is also a 5-HT_{3} receptor antagonist while lubazodone is also a 5-HT_{2A} receptor antagonist.

== History ==
Zimelidine was introduced in 1982 and was the first SSRI to be sold. Despite its efficacy, a statistically significant increase in cases of Guillain–Barré syndrome among treated patients led to its withdrawal in 1983. Fluoxetine, introduced in 1987, is commonly thought to be the first SSRI to be marketed.

== Controversy ==
Fifty years after the introduction of fluoxetine and other SSRIs, these drugs remain widely used and effective for depression. Concerns about over prescription, under-treatment of depression through other modalities, and role in the over-medicalization of normal life remain debated.

== In other organisms ==
Fluoxetine was investigated as a potential environmental contaminant, but found to have 'limited accumulation' in comparison to other pharmaceutically active compounds.

=== Veterinary use ===
An SSRI (fluoxetine) has been approved for veterinary use in treatment of canine separation anxiety. Like in human medicine, fluoxetine is extensively used off-label in animal medicine. In dogs and cats, it is mainly prescribed off-label for behavior problems.

== See also ==
- List of antidepressants
- Noradrenergic and specific serotonergic antidepressant (NaSSA)
- Serotonin releasing agent (SRA)
- Serotonin–norepinephrine reuptake inhibitor (SNRI)
- Serotonin–norepinephrine–dopamine reuptake inhibitor (SNDRI)
