= Indalpine =

Discontinued SSRI antidepressant drug

Clinical data
- Trade names: Upstène
- Other names: LM-5008

Identifiers
- IUPAC name: 3-(2-piperidin-4-ylethyl)-1H-indole
- CAS Number: 63758-79-2
- PubChem CID: 44668
- DrugBank: DB08953
- ChemSpider: 40643
- UNII: V35562QSVT
- ChEMBL: ChEMBL276520
- CompTox Dashboard (EPA): DTXSID80213196
- ECHA InfoCard: 100.058.569

Chemical and physical data
- Formula: C_{15}H_{20}N_{2}
- Molar mass: 228.339 g·mol^{−1}
- 3D model (JSmol): Interactive image
- SMILES: c2(c1ccccc1[nH]c2)CCC3CCNCC3
- InChI: InChI=1S/C15H20N2/c1-2-4-15-14(3-1)13(11-17-15)6-5-12-7-9-16-10-8-12/h1-4,11-12,16-17H,5-10H2; Key:SADQVAVFGNTEOD-UHFFFAOYSA-N

Indalpine, sold under the brand name Upstène, is a selective serotonin reuptake inhibitor (SSRI) that was briefly marketed as an antidepressant for treatment of depression. It was marketed in France and a few other European countries.

Indalpine is a selective serotonin reuptake inhibitor (SSRI) and antihistamine.

Indalpine was invented by 1977 and was introduced for medical use in France in 1983. Two years later, in 1985, it was withdrawn from the market due to toxicity. Indalpine has sometimes been said to be the first SSRI. However, it was preceded by the SSRI zimelidine (Zelmid), which was invented in 1969 and was introduced to the market in 1981 (then similarly withdrawn due to toxicity in 1983).

== Pharmacology ==
=== Pharmacodynamics ===
Indalpine is a selective serotonin reuptake inhibitor (SSRI) and antihistamine.

== Chemistry ==
Indalpine is an indole and is structurally similar to tryptamines but is not a tryptamine itself.

=== Synthesis ===

Metalation of indole (1) using methyl magnesium iodide forms the organo-magnesium derivative (2) which reacts with 1-benzyloxycarbonyl-4-piperidyl-acetyl chloride (3) to give (4). Acid-catalyzed removal of the benzyloxycarbonyl (Cbz) protecting group gives the ketone (5). Reduction with lithium aluminium hydride yields indalpine.

== History ==
A patent for indalpine was filed in 1976 and granted in 1977. It was marketed by Fournier Frères-Pharmuka in France in 1983. The drug was withdrawn from the market due to toxicity, including neutropenia or agranulocytosis and hepatic carcinogenicity, 2 years later in 1985. The drug was never introduced in the United States. Indalpine was derived from structural modification of antihistamines.

It was invented in 1977 by the pharmacologists Le Fur and Uzan at Pharmuka, a small French pharmaceutical firm, who credit Baron Shopsin and his colleagues at NYU-Bellevue or NYU School of Medicine in New York with providing the basis for their work. They were particularly influenced by the series of "synthesis inhibitor studies" carried out by Shopsin's team during the early to mid 1970s, and in particular, the clinical report by Shopsin et al. (1976) relating to PCPA's rapid reversal of antidepressant response to tranylcypromine in depressed patients. This led to an understanding of the role of the monoamine neurotransmitter serotonin (5-hydroxytryptamine, or 5HT) in the therapeutic effects of the available tricyclic and MAOI class antidepressants. The studies led to widespread recognition of a serotonin hypothesis of depression, contradicting theories that promoted the role of norepinephrine.

While citalopram and zimelidine were developed in the early 1970s, it was Pharmuka's indalpine that was first to reach the market. Baron Shopsin was recruited as consultant to Pharmuka throughout a research and development process that resulted in the marketing of indalpine in France and then worldwide, in 1982. With FDA approval of Pharmuka's Investigational New Drug (IND) submission to conduct clinical studies with indalpine and viqualine, Shopsin carried out and published the first clinical trials with these drugs in depressed outpatients in the United States. Astra's SSRI zimelidine was marketed within a year (1983), but the next crop of SSRIs did not become commercially available until the 1986 marketing of fluvoxamine in Belgium by Duphar, followed by approval in the United States later that year. Lilly's fluoxetine (Prozac) was approved in the United States in 1987.

Meanwhile, zimelidine had been withdrawn soon after its marketing in 1983 due to the emergence of Guillain–Barré syndrome, a serious neurological disease. With lingering concerns among some Common Market countries and activist groups about the potential of SSRIs to induce adverse effects, and the reported association between indalpine and hematological effects, which emerged in the aftermath of Pharmuka's take over by Rhône Poulenc, indalpine was abruptly taken off the market by Rhône Poulenc. Irish psychiatrist David Healy characterized indalpine as being "born at the wrong time" during a period when "indalpine and psychiatry was under siege" by different interest groups in some of the Common Market countries. In line with indalpine's fate, research and development was halted relating to the two other 4-alkylpiperidine derivatives developed by Pharmuka, viqualine (a serotonin releasing agent) and pipequaline (a GABA_{A} receptor positive allosteric modulator), both in different stages of development at the time.

In 2010, revision of this molecular motif yielded SERT inhibitors with nanomolar and subnanomolar IC_{50} values.

== Society and culture ==
=== Names ===
Indalpine is the generic name of the drug and its INN and BAN. It was also known by its developmental code name LM-5008. The drug was sold under the brand name Upstène.

== See also ==
- Dimethylhomotryptamine
