= Zimelidine =

SSRI antidepressant

Clinical data
- Trade names: Zimeldine, Zelmid, Normud
- Routes of administration: Oral
- ATC code: N06AB02 (WHO)

Legal status
- Legal status: Withdrawn worldwide

Pharmacokinetic data
- Elimination half-life: 8.4±2 hours (parent compound); 19.4±3.6 hours (norzimelidine)

Identifiers
- IUPAC name: (Z)-3-(4-Bromophenyl)-N,N-dimethyl-3-(pyridin-3-yl)prop-2-en-1-amine
- CAS Number: 56775-88-3 60525-15-7 (anhydrous dihydrochloride), 61129-30-4 (dihydrochloride monohydrate)
- PubChem CID: 5365247
- DrugBank: DB04832
- ChemSpider: 4517305
- UNII: 3J928617DW
- ChEMBL: ChEMBL37744
- CompTox Dashboard (EPA): DTXSID6048462

Chemical and physical data
- Formula: C_{16}H_{17}BrN_{2}
- Molar mass: 317.230 g·mol^{−1}
- 3D model (JSmol): Interactive image
- SMILES: Brc2ccc(C(=C/CN(C)C)/c1cccnc1)cc2
- InChI: InChI=1S/C16H17BrN2/c1-19(2)11-9-16(14-4-3-10-18-12-14)13-5-7-15(17)8-6-13/h3-10,12H,11H2,1-2H3/b16-9-; Key:OYPPVKRFBIWMSX-SXGWCWSVSA-N

Zimelidine, formerly sold under the brand name Zelmid among others, is an antidepressant medication of the selective serotonin reuptake inhibitor (SSRI) class, and the first SSRI antidepressant to be marketed. It is a pyridylallylamine, and is structurally different from other antidepressants.

Zimelidine was developed in the late 1970s and early 1980s by Arvid Carlsson, Hans Corrodi and Peter Berntsson, who were then collaborating with the Swedish company Astra AB. Their work began with a series of antihistamines known as pheniramines that were found to block both serotonin and noradrenaline reuptake, and among these, brompheniramine was identified as the most potent serotonin reuptake blocker and was therefore selected as the starting point for their synthesis program, ultimately leading to the invention of zimelidine as a derivative of brompheniramine. Zimelidine was first sold in 1982.

While zimelidine had a very favorable safety profile comparing to other commonly used antidepressants like tricyclic antidepressants at the time it was developed, within a year and a half of its introduction, rare case reports of Guillain–Barré syndrome emerged that appeared to be caused by the drug, prompting its manufacturer to withdraw it from the market. Its withdrawal, due to this unpredictable neurological side effect, marked a swift end to its clinical use despite its pioneering efficacy. After its withdrawal, it was succeeded by fluvoxamine and fluoxetine (derived from another antihistamine diphenhydramine) and in that order, and the other SSRIs.

== Other uses ==
Zimelidine was reported by Montplaisir and Godbout to be very effective for cataplexy in 1986, back when this was usually controlled by tricyclic antidepressants, which often had anticholinergic effects. Zimelidine was able to improve cataplexy without causing daytime sleepiness.

== Side effects ==
Zimelidine was generally reported to cause fewer anticholinergic, sedative, and cardiovascular adverse effects than the tricyclic antidepressants with which it was compared.

Reported adverse effects included headache, nausea, insomnia, muscle pain, joint pain, fever, neurological symptoms, and abnormalities of liver function. A hypersensitivity reaction characterized by fever, muscle or joint pain, and transient increases in liver enzymes was reported in approximately 1.5% of patients in an earlier review.

Rare cases of serious peripheral neuropathy, particularly Guillain–Barré syndrome, were associated with zimelidine and led to its withdrawal from the market.

== Mechanism of action ==
Zimelidine acts primarily by selectively inhibiting the neuronal reuptake of serotonin (5-hydroxytryptamine, 5-HT), thereby increasing serotonin concentrations in the synaptic cleft and enhancing serotonergic neurotransmission.

Zimelidine and its principal active metabolite, norzimelidine, preferentially inhibit serotonin uptake while having little effect on the reuptake of noradrenaline or dopamine. The drug lacks monoamine oxidase inhibitory activity and has negligible affinity for histamine, adrenergic, and serotonin receptors at therapeutic concentrations, contributing to its greater selectivity compared with earlier antidepressants.

== Interactions ==
Zimelidine should not be used concurrently with monoamine oxidase inhibitors (MAOIs), because combining an SSRI with an MAOI can cause potentially life-threatening serotonin toxicity.

In a small randomized crossover study in six healthy men, ethanol reduced the conversion of zimelidine to its active metabolite, norzimelidine, but did not alter their combined exposure. Zimelidine enhanced some ethanol-related impairments, including effects on memory, body sway, and manual tracking.

== See also ==
- Ranitidine
- RTI-353
- Triprolidine
- SB-649915
