= Development and discovery of SSRI drugs =

Selective serotonin reuptake inhibitors, or serotonin-specific re-uptake inhibitor (SSRIs), are a class of chemical compounds that have application as antidepressants and in the treatment of depression and other psychiatric disorders. SSRIs are therapeutically useful in the treatment of panic disorder (PD), posttraumatic stress disorder (PTSD), social anxiety disorder (also known as social phobia), obsessive-compulsive disorder (OCD), premenstrual dysphoric disorder (PMDD), and anorexia. There is also clinical evidence of the value of SSRIs in the treatment of the symptoms of schizophrenia and their ability to prevent cardiovascular diseases.

SSRIs primarily inhibit serotonin transporter (SERT) in the brain and have negligible effects on dopamine transporter (DAT) and norepinephrine transporter (NET). Inhibiting the binding of the neurotransmitter serotonin (5-HT) to SERT results in increased 5-HT concentration in the synaptic cleft leading to increased binding of 5-HT to postsynaptic receptors. This was once thought to be the mechanism that resulted in improvement of depression symptoms, however more recent systematic review of the academic literature has established that there is no correlation between 5-HT concentration or activity in the brain and depressive symptoms.

SSRIs have dominated the market for antidepressants and are recommended by the National Institute for Health and Clinical Excellence (NICE) as a first-line treatment of depression, because they tend to have fewer adverse effects than other type of antidepressants with the same effectiveness.

== Development history ==
Before the discovery of SSRI drugs, the treatments for mood disorders were relatively limited. Now, however, there are dozens of antidepressants on the market for the treatment of depression. Monoamine oxidase inhibitors (MAOIs) and tricyclic antidepressants (TCAs) were the first drugs to be developed for the treatment of depression, dating back to the early 1950s. Because of their undesirable adverse-effect profile and high potential for toxicity, due to their non-selective pharmacological effects, strict regimens were needed for taking the drugs, which limited their use. Because of this, researchers looked for other alternatives with similar effectiveness but fewer adverse effects e.g. drugs that did not cause cardiac conduction abnormalities in overdoses or have the tendency to cause seizures, which led to the discovery of the SSRI drugs. The SSRIs are the most significant class of antidepressants marketed in recent years and are one of the major medicinal discoveries of the last few decades. SSRIs were the first drugs to establish a theoretical pathophysiological role for 5-HT in affective illnesses and in the broad spectrum of anxiety disorders. Likewise, they were the first to confirm the inhibition of neurotransmitter re-uptake as an important therapeutic principle.

The SSRIs are the first rationally designed class of psychotropic medications. The strategy behind rational drug design is to develop a new drug that is capable of affecting a specific biological target, or in this case a special neural site of action (uptake pumps, receptors), while trying to avoid effects on other site of actions. The goal in such development is to produce pharmacological agents that are more efficacious, safer and better tolerated than older medications.

Figure 1 Chemical structure of zimelidine

An initial success was achieved when medicinal chemists set out in search of the ideal SSRI with the chemical synthesis of zimelidine (figure 1) from the antihistamine drug brompheniramine, which exhibited selective inhibition of 5-HT re-uptake with minimal inhibition of norepinephrine (NE) re-uptake. Most importantly, zimelidine did not come with the adverse effect profile as the TCAs and therefore it became the template for the second generation SSRIs. Zimelidine was the first SSRI to be marketed, but several cases of Guillain–Barré syndrome were associated with the use of the drug which led to withdrawal from the market in 1983. Subsequently, several non-tricyclic SSRIs were discovered and marketed.

Fluoxetine, which was FDA approved in 1987, is usually thought to be the first SSRI to be marketed. The work which eventually led to the discovery of fluoxetine began at Eli Lilly and Company in 1970 as a collaboration between Bryan Molloy and Ray Fuller. It was known at that time that the antihistamine diphenhydramine showed some antidepressant-like properties. 3-Phenoxy-3-phenylpropylamine, a compound structurally similar to diphenhydramine, was taken as a starting point. Molloy and fellow Eli Lilly chemist Klaus Schmiegel synthesized a series of dozens of its derivatives. Hoping to find a derivative inhibiting only serotonin reuptake, another Eli Lilly scientist, David T. Wong, proposed to retest the series for the in vitro reuptake of serotonin, norepinephrine and dopamine, using a technique developed by neuroscientist Solomon Snyder. This test showed the compound later named fluoxetine to be the most potent and selective inhibitor of serotonin reuptake of the series.

Introduction of fluoxetine to the market is hailed as a miracle drug for the treatment of depression because it had fewer adverse effects, simpler dosing strategies and greater margin of safety when overdoses were consumed and thus it had better adherence, compared to the older antidepressants (TCAs and MAOIs). Fluoxetine paved the way for the next generation of SSRIs, serving as a prototype for them. Since then the number of drugs in the SSRI class has become bigger and there are now six (fluoxetine, paroxetine, citalopram, escitalopram, sertraline, and fluvoxamine), as demonstrated in table 1.

Table 1: SSRI drugs used to treat depression.
	fluoxetine	sertraline	paroxetine	fluvoxamine	citalopram	escitalopram
Pharmaceutical forms	Capsules, soluble- or dispersible tablets, oral solution	Tablets, oral concentrate	Tablets, oral suspension	Tablets, oral solution, capsules	Tablets, oral solution	Tablets, oral solution
Brand name	Prozac, Fontex, Seromex, Depex, Seronil, Flutop, Fluctin	Zoloft, Sertral, Lustral, Asentra, Tresleen	Paxil, Seroxat, Paroxat, Paxetin, Aropax, Deroxat	Luvox	Celexa, Cipramil, Cipram, Citox, Oropram, Sepram	Lexapro, Cipralex, Esopram, Seroplex
FDA approval date	December 29, 1987	December 30, 1991	December 29, 1992	December 5, 1994	July 17, 1998	August 14, 2002

== Mechanism of action ==
Precise mechanism of antidepressant activity of SSRIs remains somewhat uncertain, but a number of biochemical functions associated with SSRI treatment have been established. SSRIs primarily inhibit SERT in the brain and have negligible effects on DAT and NET. The SSRIs also have less affinity for α_{1}, α_{2}, H_{1} and muscarinic receptors, which might explain the differences of adverse events between TCAs and SSRIs.

Although SSRIs arrive rapidly to the brain after administration and the effects on 5-HT re-uptake can be measured instantly, it takes about 2–4 weeks to get therapeutic effects. The SSRIs have very high and selective affinity for SERT and after administration they inhibit SERT immediately. SERT inhibition is implicated in the antidepressant activity of SSRIs. 70-80% inhibition of SERT is usually necessary to induce antidepressant effects and higher dosage does not induce greater antidepressant effects for average patients. Higher dosage does, however, increase the incidence and severity of adverse events associated with excessive 5-HT re-uptake inhibition.

Figure 2 Inhibition of re-uptake transport proteins, e.g. SERT, results in increased concentration of neurotransmitters, e.g. 5-HT, in the synaptic cleft, leading to improvement of depression symptoms

SSRIs prevent 5-HT from binding to SERT which prevents absorption of 5-HT back into the presynapse terminal, where it is metabolized by monoamine oxidase or stored in secretory vesicles. As a result, the 5-HT concentration increases at the somatodendritic area of the 5-HT neuron but not so much at the axon terminal area (demonstrated in figure 2). This increase in 5-HT concentration causes desensitization of somatodendritic 5-HT_{1A} autoreceptors. When these 5-HT_{1A} autoreceptors have been downregulated, they will no longer restrict the impulse flow of the 5-HT neuron. The impulse flow is turned on and as a result 5-HT is released at the axon terminal. However, this increase of 5-HT does not happen quickly compared to the increase of 5-HT at the somatodendritic area of the 5-HT neuron. This delay is caused by the time it takes 5-HT to downregulate 5-HT_{1A} autoreceptors and turn on the neuro impulse flow of the 5-HT neuron. This delay can explain the reason why antidepressants do not have effect on depression immediately. This can also be the reason why the antidepressant mechanisms can be connected to the increasing neuro impulse flow from 5-HT neurons, where as the concentration of 5-HT increases at the axon terminal before SSRIs start to work properly. When SSRIs have (1) inhibited the re-uptake pump, (2) increased somatodendritic 5-HT, (3) desensitized somatodendritic 5-HT_{1A} autoreceptors, (4) turned on the impulse flow and (5) increased the release of 5-HT from axon terminal, the last step might be desensitization of postsynaptic 5-HT receptors. This desensitization could be the reason for reduction of adverse effects of SSRIs as tolerance develops.

== Adverse effects ==
Although generally well tolerated and numerous advantages over other antidepressants, SSRIs are not devoid of adverse effects. The adverse effects of SSRIs are usually predictable from a knowledge of their pharmacology and are dose related. Such adverse effects are gastrointestinal dysfunction (nausea, diarrhea, epigastric discomfort), effects on the central nervous system (CNS) (anxiety, fatigue, tremor), anticholinergic effects (dry mouth, blurred vision, drowsiness, difficulty in urination) and sexual dysfunction (anorgasmia, low to no libido, erectile dysfunction, numb genitals, retrograde ejaculation, loss of erotic dreams or delayed ejaculation). Occasionally symptoms of sexual dysfunction persist after discontinuation of SSRIs. SSRIs adverse effects are generally mild and temporary and are more of a discomfort than a serious threat in terms of systemic toxicity. Therefore, the adverse effect profile of the SSRIs may offer certain therapeutic advantages in the management of depression.

== Pharmacology ==
SSRIs are well absorbed in the gastrointestinal tract and reach peak plasma levels within 1–8 hours. During absorption SSRIs bind to proteins and are widely distributed throughout the body, including the brain, whereas they are lipophilic. Metabolism and elimination takes place mainly in the liver and most of the SSRIs produce pharmacologically active metabolites, as demonstrated in table 3 among with other pharmacology properties of the SSRIs.

Table 3 Comparative pharmacology of SSRIs

Drug	t_{max} (h)	Bioavailability (%)	V_{D} (L/kg)	Protein binding (%)	t_{1/2}	Metabolism	Active metabolites	Excretion
Fluoxetine	6–8	60–80	20–45	94.5	Acute administration, 1–3 days. Chronic administration, 4–6 days. Norfluoxetine, acute and chronic administration, 4–16 days	Extensive first-pass hepatic mainly by CYP2D6 by desmethylation. Non-linear pharmacokinetic profile	Norfluoxetine	Mainly (60%) urine
Sertraline	4.5–8.4	Absolute bioavailability has not been determined in humans	20	98	25–26 hours	Extensive first-pass hepatic primarily by CYP2B6	Desmethyl-sertraline (limited activity)	Faeces and urine in equal amount
Paroxetine	6–10	30–60	3.1–28	93–95	21–24 hours	Extensive first-pass hepatic primarily by CYP2D6. Non-linear pharmacokinetic profile	No clinically important metabolites	Urine (64%) and faeces (36%) (via the bile)
Fluvoxamine	3–8	50	25	77–80	15.6 hours	Hepatic by CYP1A2 and CYP3A4	No clinically important metabolites	Mainly urine
Citalopram	2–4	80	12	50	35 hours	Hepatic by CYP3A4 and CYP2C19 mainly via N-demethylation	Desmethyl-citalopram	12–23% unchanged in the urine and 10% in faeces
Escitalopram	4–5	80	12	56	27–32 hours	Hepatic by CYP3A4 and CYP2C19 mainly via N-demethylation	(S)-demethylcitalopram. Not clinically important	8–10% (of escitalopram and (S)-demethylcitalopram (S-DCT)) in the urine

t_{max} = Time to peak plasma level after oral dose; V_{D} = Volume of distribution; t_{1/2} = Elimination half-life

== Structural and mechanical differences between the SSRIs ==
It is recognized that both the position and the type of substitution on an aromatic moiety of the SSRI compounds are important for the higher specificity to SERT. Halogen substituents on the aromatic ring are found to be largely responsible for SSRIs specificity to SERT, but all SSRIs possess at specific positions halogen atoms (table 2). For the SERT protein, however, the structural basis of its specificity for SSRIs is poorly understood. Research has shown that the SSRI halogens all bind to exactly the same halogen-binding pocket (HBP) within the SERT protein and mutation at this HBP in SERT dramatically reduces the transporters affinity for SSRIs.

SSRI's are by definition selective, but they also bind to the homologous NET and DAT, although with much lower affinity than to their principal target SERT. The selectivity of SSRIs for SERT is notable in that only one or two different functional group substituents are sufficient to convert an SSRI into a norepinephrine reuptake inhibitor (NRI) with higher affinity to NE. SSRI antidepressants all have the same mechanism of action and are at least 10-fold more selective for 5-HT re-uptake inhibition than for NE re-uptake inhibition. However, despite the sharing of the same mechanism of action, SSRIs differ in their potency and selectivity in inhibiting 5-HT re-uptake and many of them have important effects on other transporters and receptors. SSRIs are structurally diverse with clear variations in their pharmacodynamic and pharmacokinetic profiles, which leads to differences among them in their half-lifes, clinical activity, adverse effects and drug interactions, which explains the differences in their efficacy and tolerability among patients. However, all SSRIs are clinically equal when it comes to their efficacy over time.

Table 2 Comparison of the chemical properties of SSRI drugs

Drug	IUPAC-name	Classification	Halogen	Specificity
Fluoxetine	Methyl(3-phenyl-3-[4-(trifluoromethyl)phenoxy]propyl)amine	Fluoxetine belongs to the phenylpropylamines. They contain a phenylpropylamine moiety which consists of a phenyl group substituted at the third carbon by a propan-1-amine.	3F	The least selective inhibitor of the SSRIs. Also inhibits NE and DA re-uptake. Also affects 5-HT_{2C} receptors, CYP2D6 and CYP3A4.
Fluvoxamine	(E)-(2-aminoethoxy)({5-methoxy-1-[4-(trifluoromethyl)phenyl]pentylidene})amine		3F	
Sertraline	(1S,4S)-4-(3,4-Dichlorophenyl)-N-methyl-1,2,3,4-tetrahydronaphthalen-1-amine	Sertraline belongs to the tametralines. They contain a tametraline moiety which consists of a tetrahydronaphthalene linked to a phenyl group to form N-methyl-4-phenyl-1,2,3,4-tetrahydronaphthalen-1-amine skeleton.	2Cl	The second most potent inhibitor of the SSRIs. Also affects DA and NE re-uptake.
Paroxetine	(3S,4R)-3-[(2H-1,3-Benzodioxol-5-yloxy)methyl]-4-(4-fluorophenyl)piperidine	Paroxetine belongs to the phenylpiperidines. They contain a phenylpiperidine skeleton which consists of a piperidine bound to a phenyl group.	F	The most potent 5-HT re-uptake blocker. It's the most potent blocker of muscarinic receptors among the SSRIs. Also affects histamine H_{1} receptors, nitric oxide synthases (NOSs) and CYP2D6.
Citalopram	1-[3-(Dimethylamino)propyl]-1-(4-fluorophenyl)-1,3-dihydro-2-benzofuran-5-carbonitrile	Citalopram belongs to the benzofurans which are organic compounds containing a benzene ring fused to a furan.	F	The second most selective inhibitor of the SSRIs.
Escitalopram	(1S)-1-[3-(Dimethylamino)propyl]-1-(4-fluorophenyl)-1,3-dihydro-2-benzofuran-5-carbonitrile	Escitalopram is the "S" enantiomer of citalopram, and thus belongs to the same class of benzofurans which citalopram belongs to.	F	The newest and most selective inhibitor of the SSRIs.

=== Structure-activity relationship (SAR) ===
==== Phenoxyphenylpropylamine derivatives ====
Figure 3 Primary structure of aryloxypropylamine (a) and aryloxypropylamine with phenyl substituents (b)

Compounds containing an aryloxypropylamine motif in their structure, demonstrated in figure 3a, are known as monoamine reuptake inhibitors. Drugs containing this privileged structural motif, where R^{1} and R^{2} are aryls or heteroaryls, preferable phenyl, possess a selectivity profile for NET and SERT. While compounds containing a substituent in the 2'-position of the aroxyl ring of the structure (figure 3b) exhibits selectivity and high affinity for NET, and are therefore generally SNRIs, compounds having substituent in the 4'-position exhibits selectivity and high affinity for SERT and are therefore generally SSRIs, e.g. fluoxetine and paroxetine.

Figure 4 Chemical structure of (S)-fluoxetine

Fluoxetine is a racemic mixture of (R)- and (S)-fluoxetine where both enantiomers contribute to its biological activity. Since mono-substitution in the 4-para position of the phenoxy group (figure 4) results in selective inhibition of 5-HT re-uptake, a disubstitution i.e. 2,3- or 2,4- substitution therefore results in a loss of SERT selectivity. Fluoxetine has the widest spectrum of activity since it is the least SERT selective of all the SSRIs. Fluoxetine also has a 5-HT_{2C} antagonist activity where it blocks the 5-HT activity of 5-HT_{2C} receptors enhancing the release of both NE and DA. A 5-HT_{2C} antagonist do not only help out with therapeutic effects of fluoxetine but also the tolerability of the drug. The advantage of being 5-HT_{2C} antagonist is that it has a stimulatory effect and many patients have experienced an increase in energy, concentration and focus and a decrease in fatigue from the very first dose. The stimulant activity of 5-HT_{2C} antagonist can however, be a disadvantage for patients with agitation, insomnia and anxiety. Another feature of fluoxetine is a weak NE re-uptake inhibition which can have clinical effect in higher doses. Fluoxetine also has a long half-life which can reduce withdrawal symptoms which are characteristic for some SSRIs after abrupt discontinuation, but it also means that it takes a long time to clear the drug and its active metabolite after discontinuing fluoxetine treatment.

Figure 5 Chemical structure of (–)-(3S,4R)-paroxetine

Paroxetine is a constrained structural analogue of fluoxetine where the linear phenylpropylamine group of fluoxetine has been folded into a piperidine ring (figure 5). The compound has the possibility of four stereoisomers because it contains two chiral centers, but one of them, the (3S,4R)-isomer, is marketed as paroxetine. Research has shown that stereochemical factors affect affinity of the molecule for SERT where substitution into the 2-ortho-position of either aromatic rings decreases affinity for rat SERT by as much as 10–100 times, where the greatest loss occurs in the phenoxy ring.

Paroxetine is the most potent SSRI drug available, but it is less selective for SERT than fluvoxamine and sertraline. Paroxetine also has weak NET inhibition which could contribute to its efficacy in depression, especially at higher doses. As demonstrated in table 2, paroxetine also inhibits the NOSs enzyme which could be the reason for its sexual dysfunction adverse effect, especially in men. Paroxetine shows the highest affinity for muscarinic receptors of all the SSRIs which results in weak anticholinergic activity and therefore undesirable adverse effects.

Figure 6 Chemical structure of talopram

While scientists were trying to create a new antidepressant to inhibit the NE re-uptake they accidentally synthesised two new compounds, named talopram and talsupram. The two compounds where not marketed in spite of being potent SNRIs because a number of suicide attempts were reported in clinical trials. With minor changes to the chemical structure of talopram (figure 6), including a single 6-cyano (CN) substitution, scientists were able to convert talopram into a potent SSRI, called citalopram. But citalopram can also be viewed as a constrained analogue of paroxetine.

Figure 7 Chemical structures of (R)- and (S)-enantiomers of citalopram

Citalopram has the second most selectivity for SERT, no effects on NE or DA re-uptake and nor does it have affinity to other neuroreceptors. Citalopram is composed of two enantiomers, (R)- and (S)-, which are mirror images of each other (figure 7). Researches has shown that nearly all the activity resides in the (S)-enantiomer and that (R)-citalopram actually counteracts the action of the (S)-enantiomer. The combination of the two enantiomers is known as racemic citalopram and has weak antihistaminic properties that reside in the (R)-enantiomer. Solution to improve the properties of racemic citalopram is to remove the unwanted (R)-enantiomer. The resulting drug is better known as escitalopram, but it is composed of only the pure active (S)-(+)-isomer. This change appears to remove the antihistaminic properties of the drug. By removing the (R)-enantiomer, the lowest dose of escitalopram becomes more efficacious and faster onset than comparable dose of citalopram, where escitalopram has twice the activity of citalopram and is at least 27 times more potent than the (R)-enantiomer. Escitalopram is therefore the only SSRI drug for which pure SERT inhibition is responsible for almost all of its pharmacological action. Escitalopram is the newest and most selective inhibitor of the SSRIs and is today considered the best tolerated SSRI.

==== Aminotetraline derivatives ====
Figure 8 Chemical structure of (+)-cis-(1S,4S)-sertraline

Tametraline, a compound synthesized in 1978 by Pfizer, was shown to be a potent NE and DA re-uptake inhibitor with animal studies. Later on a surprisingly substantial enhancement of blocking activity of 5-HT uptake was achieved by adding chlorine atoms at C-3 and C-4 to the structure of tametraline, resulting in (+)-trans-(1R,4S)-N-methyl-4-phenyl-1-aminotetralin, a potent but nonselective uptake blocker. The (+)-cis-(1S,4S)-isomer, one of four compounds diastereomers, however exhibited significantly more selective and potent 5-HT uptake inhibiting activity compared to the other three diastereomers, where the 4-phenyl ring favours attachments at 5-HT uptake sites. The compound was named sertraline (figure 8). Although sertraline appears to differ structurally from the other SSRIs, it has a phenylaminotetralin in its structure, in which the diphenylpropylamine nucleus has been forced into a stiff bicyclic ring system.

Sertraline is the second most potent inhibitor of 5-HT re-uptake which has two very interesting characteristics that distinguish it i.e. sertraline's (1) inhibiting effect on DAT and NET and (2) the binding to sigma-1 (σ_{1}) receptor in CNS. The DAT and NET inhibition is controversial because of much weaker inhibition which it has, compared to SERT inhibition. Sertraline has about 60 times more potent inhibition potential on 5-HT than either NE or DA re-uptake. It is possible that only modest inhibition of DAT and NET is needed to cause an increase in energy, motivation and concentration, specially when added to other activity such as SERT inhibition. Sertraline has also been found to have high affinity for the CNS σ_{1} receptors. A role of the σ_{1} site in the pharmacological action of sertraline may exist, but the significance of sertraline affinity for σ_{1} receptors remains unclear.

=== Binding of SSRIs to SERT protein ===
The molecular basis for SSRIs function, including their binding mode and molecular mechanism of 5-HT re-uptake inhibition in SERT, is not fully understood and is a matter of debate. Such information is very important for the understanding of essential aspects of the drugs action, ranging from selectivity profile to therapeutic efficacy and the development of new and improved drugs that target the human SERT.

The three-dimensional (3D) structure of SERT is not known and has been the main obstacle for elucidation of the structural mechanism of the human SERT. Update: X-ray crystallography data is available as of 2017 it seems (https://www.rcsb.org/structure/6AWO)... Comparative molecular modeling have been used in research to create structural models of human SERT in complex with its ligand but has not given good results because of low phylogenetic and functional similarity between human SERT and available template proteins. However the 3D structure of some bacterial homologous transporters like the leucine transporter (LeuT) is known. The human SERT, NET and DAT are all members of the neurotransmitter:sodium symporter (NSS) protein family. SERT contains approximately 630 amino acids that are predicted to form 12 transmembrane alpha-helixes (TMs) which are connected with intra- and extracellular loops (ILs and ELs). LeuT, which is also a member of the NSS family that functions as an amino acid transporter, was crystallized from Aquifex aeolicus by Yamashita et al., and shares 20-25% identity in primary structure with the human neurotransmitter transporters. Therefore, the crystal structure of LeuT and its transport mechanism have been proven to be a good model system for the study of NSS proteins. Although detailed transport mechanism of the NSS proteins is not fully understood, it is clear that in order for transport to occur a rearrangement of large proteins needs to take place.

LeuT has been co-crystallised with sertraline and (R)- and (S)-fluoxetine where the SSRIs have been found to bind as non-competitive inhibitors in a vestibule binding site (can be looked at as a second binding site), which is separated from the drugs binding site by the site chains of the two aromatic amino acids of the extracellular gate of the transport protein. The halogens on the SSRIs chemical structure all bind to the same HBP within LeuT and interact with similar amino acids, but the amino acid sequence in the HBP is highly preserved between LeuT and SERT. That suggest that in the human SERT the SSRIs also bind both at the same position and with similar manner, which is a key feature making the SSRIs selective for SERT. Conversely, there could be differences in their binding where the other part of the drug molecule will likely bind to SERT in a different way, given the diversity in their structure. The localisation of the vestibular binding site, as the primary SSRI binding site in SERT is, is however controversial since some research has shown that the SSRIs work in competitive manner by binding to the drugs binding site, not to the second binding site.

==== Binding of fluoxetine to LeuT protein ====
Both enantiomers of fluoxetine show a similar affinity for SERT. However, NE:5HT selective ratio gives the impression that the (S)-enantiomer is 100 times more selective for SERT inhibition than the (R)-enantiomer. The (R)-(+)-stereoisomer is almost 8 times more potent an inhibitor of SERT together with a longer duration of action than the (S)-(−)-isomer. (S)-(−)-norfluoxetine metabolite is seven times more potent an inhibitor on 5-HT transporter then (R)-(+)-metabolite, with selectivity ratio almost equivalent to that of (S)-fluoxetine.

Both enantiomers of fluoxetine bind to the extracellular vestibule on the LeuT protein is such a way that the three fluorine atoms of the methylphenoxy ring bind into the HBP that is formed by Leu25, Gly26, Leu29, Arg30 and Tyr108. The halogens additionally make Van der Waals interaction with Leu29 and Tyr108, where the (S)-enantiomer additionally binds to Phe253 and makes Van der Waals contact with it among with previously mentioned amino acids. Because of the (S)-enantiomers opposite chirality to the (R)-enantiomer the rest of the molecule is reversed in the HBP, where the amine tail points towards the extracellular space and interacts with the N-terminal of Leu400, Asp401 and Ala319 (amino acids which are a part of the TM10). In this LeuT bound form the complex is rather rigid. The methylphenoxy ring rotates about the O5-C6 bond by 46 degrees for the (R)-enantiomer and 16 degrees for the (S)-enantiomer, but rigidity in the molecular structure indicates that the drug maintains its low-energy configuration upon binding to its protein target.

==== Binding of sertraline to LeuT protein ====
Sertaline binds to the same extracellular vestibule in LeuT as fluoxetine where the two chlorine atoms on the phenyl ring bind to HBP formed by Leu25, Gly26, Leu29, Arg30, Tyr108, Ile111 and Phe253. The halogens additionally make Van der Waals contact with Leu29, Tyr108 and Phe253. The tetralin (tetrahydronaphthalene) on the other end of sertraline’s structure is in contact with Leu400, Asp401 and Thr409 (which are a part of the TM10) as well as the molecule interacts with Ala319 of the EL4 hairpin loop and Arg30 and Gin34 of the TM1, where the amine tail points towards the cytoplasm. The bound sertraline molecule has its dichlorophenyl ring rotated about the C4-C13 bond by 180 degrees compared to the free drug.

==== Binding of escitalopram to human SERT protein ====
Andersen et al. were able to generate a model of the (S)-citalopram binding site in human SERT by combining mutational analysis and comparative modeling where they found out that Asn-177 and Phe-341 where key determinants for (S)-citalopram potency and high affinity inhibition in addition to Tyr-95, Asp-98, Ile-172 and Ser438 previously described, where three functional groups of the inhibitors structure bind to the transporters amino acids. (S)-citalopram is positioned as that the cyanophthalane-. fluorophenyl- and methylaminoprpyl moieties occupy three different sub-pockets within the SERT binding pocket. Ile-172 and Phe-341 are likely not in direct contact with the drug molecule, but they are very important for controlling alignment of the inhibitor.

== See also ==
- Serotonin
- Selective serotonin reuptake inhibitors
- Monoamine reuptake inhibitors
- Second-generation antidepressant
- Serotonin-norepinephrine reuptake inhibitors
