= C22H35NO2 =

The molecular formula C_{22}H_{35}NO_{2} (molar mass: 345.52 g/mol, exact mass: 345.2668 u) may refer to:

- Himbacine
- LY-255582
