= C16H19NO =

The molecular formula C_{16}H_{19}NO (molar mass: 241.33 g/mol) may refer to:

- Litoxetine
- 2-MDP (U-23807A)
- N-Methyl-PPPA, or N-methyl-3-phenoxy-3-phenylpropan-1-amine
- PEA-NBOMe
