= SCH-79797 =

Chemical compound

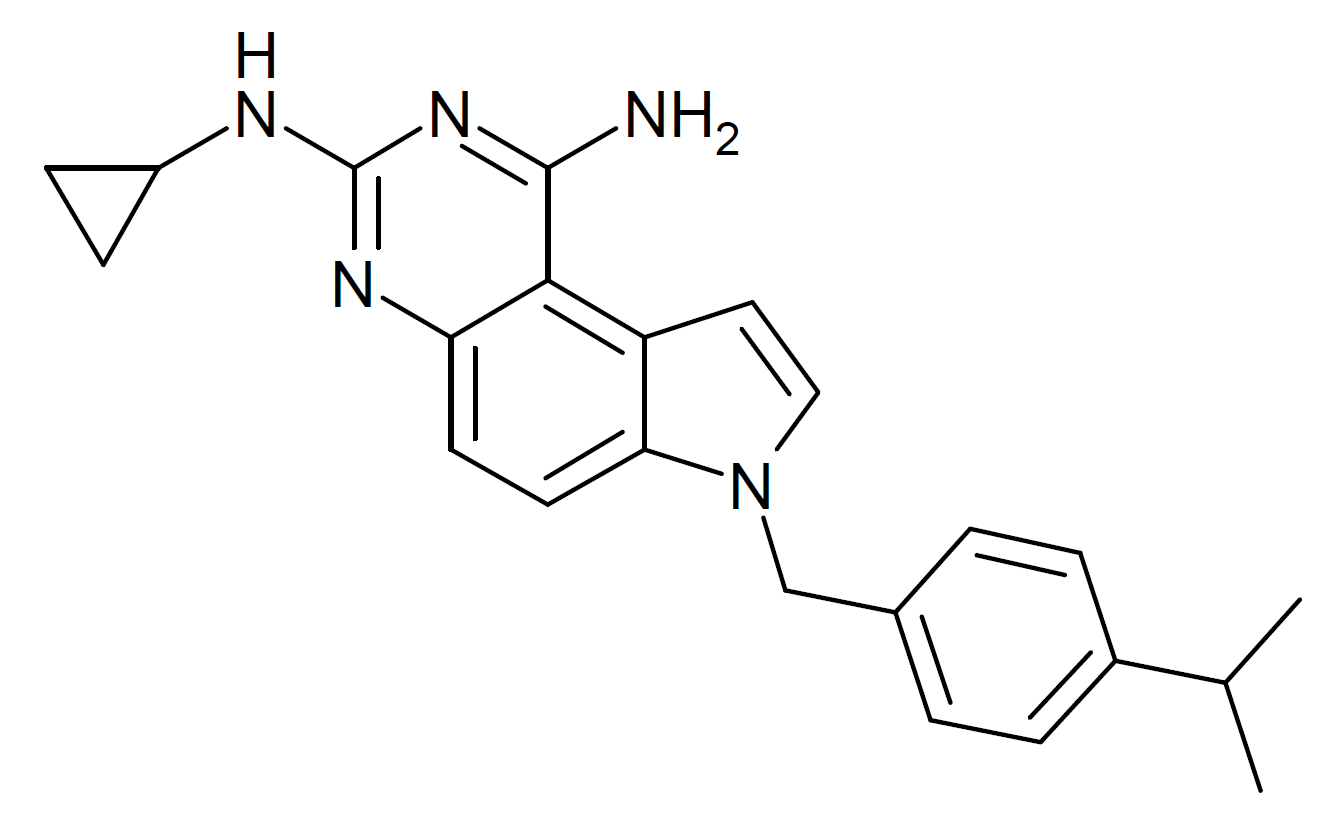

Identifiers
- IUPAC name: N^{3}-cyclopropyl-7-[(4-propan-2-ylphenyl)methyl]pyrrolo[3,2-f]quinazoline-1,3-diamine
- CAS Number: 1216720-69-2
- PubChem CID: 4259181
- ChemSpider: 3466882
- ChEBI: CHEBI:94998

Chemical and physical data
- Formula: C_{23}H_{25}N_{5}
- Molar mass: 371.488 g·mol^{−1}
- 3D model (JSmol): Interactive image
- SMILES: CC(C)C1=CC=C(C=C1)CN2C=CC3=C2C=CC4=C3C(=NC(=N4)NC5CC5)N
- InChI: InChI=1S/C23H25N5/c1-14(2)16-5-3-15(4-6-16)13-28-12-11-18-20(28)10-9-19-21(18)22(24)27-23(26-19)25-17-7-8-17/h3-6,9-12,14,17H,7-8,13H2,1-2H3,(H3,24,25,26,27); Key:AVXQPEKZIGPIJW-UHFFFAOYSA-N

SCH-79797 is a drug which acts as a potent and selective antagonist of the thrombin receptor proteinase activated receptor 1 (PAR1). It has anticoagulant, anticonvulsant and antiinflammatory effects and has been researched as a treatment for heart attack and stroke, though never developed for medical use. It also shows antibiotic actions which are not shared with other PAR1 antagonists such as vorapaxar, so may be mediated through a different target than PAR1.
