= PAR3 =

PAR3 may refer to:

- Parchive, an error correction system for computer files. The third version is known as PAR3.
- Protease activated receptor 3, a G-protein coupled receptor protein
- Pseudoautosomal region 3, a region of homologous sequences between the human X and Y chromosome
- Partitioning defective 3 homolog, a protein that in humans is encoded by the PARD3 gene

== See also ==
- 3PAR
