= N-Methyl-PPPA =

Chemical compound

Clinical data
- Other names: Detrifluoromethylfluoxetine
- ATC code: None

Identifiers
- IUPAC name: N-Methyl-3-phenoxy-3-phenyl-1-propanamine
- CAS Number: 56161-70-7
- PubChem CID: 15894873
- ChemSpider: 16340904
- UNII: C6C3GB68TV
- ChEMBL: ChEMBL4865485
- CompTox Dashboard (EPA): DTXSID001289081

Chemical and physical data
- Formula: C_{16}H_{19}NO
- Molar mass: 241.334 g·mol^{−1}
- 3D model (JSmol): Interactive image
- SMILES: CNCCC(Oc1ccccc1)c2ccccc2
- InChI: InChI=1S/C16H19NO/c1-17-13-12-16(14-8-4-2-5-9-14)18-15-10-6-3-7-11-15/h2-11,16-17H,12-13H2,1H3; Key:DMOUAPYFRKLFHO-UHFFFAOYSA-N

N-Methyl-PPPA, or N-methyl-3-phenoxy-3-phenylpropan-1-amine, is a serotonin-norepinephrine reuptake inhibitor (SNRI) which was developed by Eli Lilly from diphenhydramine in the early 1970s while in search of new antidepressants, but was never marketed. It is closely related structurally to fluoxetine, atomoxetine, and nisoxetine.

== See also ==
- 3-Phenoxy-3-phenylpropan-1-amine (PPPA)
- Development and discovery of SSRI drugs
- Aryloxypropanamine scaffold
