= Proteinase-activated receptor 1 =

Mammalian protein found in humans

F2R
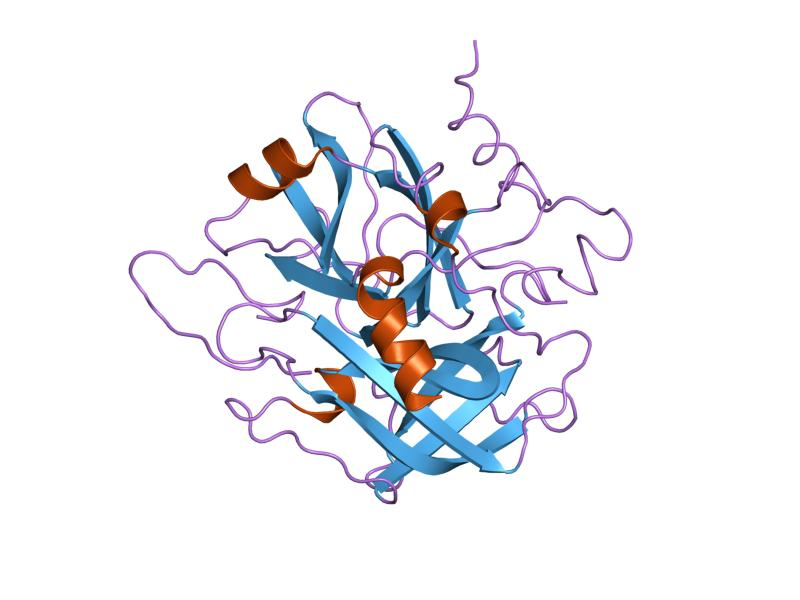

Identifiers
- Aliases: F2R, CHTR, PAR-1, PAR1, TR, Coagulation factor II receptor, coagulation factor II thrombin receptor
- External IDs: OMIM: 187930; MGI: 101802; GeneCards: F2R
Available structures
PDB	Ortholog search: PDBe RCSB
PDB	List of PDB id codes 1NRN, 1NRO, 1NRP, 1NRQ, 1NRR, 3BEF, 3HKI, 3HKJ, 3LU9, 3VW7

Gene location (Human)
Chr.	Chromosome 5 (human)
Band	5q13.3	Start	76,716,126 bp
Band	5q13.3	End	76,735,770 bp

Gene location (Mouse)
Chr.	Chromosome 13 (mouse)
Band	13 D1|13 50.21 cM	Start	95,738,311 bp
Band	13 D1|13 50.21 cM	End	95,754,995 bp
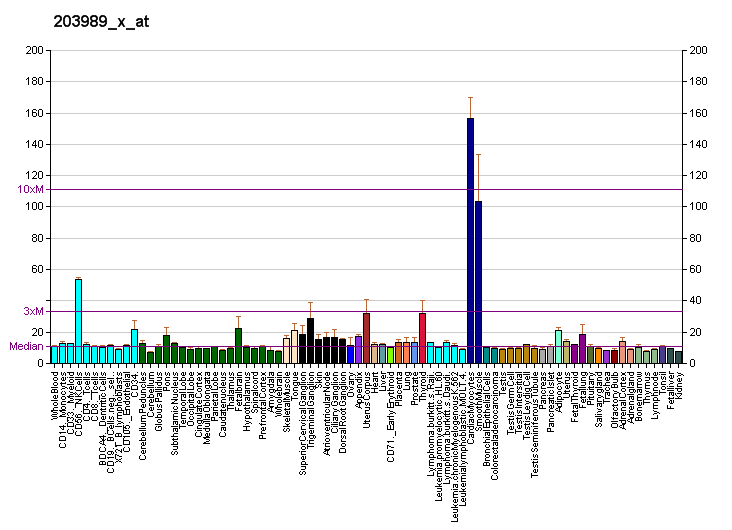
RNA expression pattern
Bgee	Human / Mouse (ortholog); Top expressed in: stromal cell of endometrium; ventricular zone; decidua; ganglionic eminence; right lung; gallbladder; skin of hip; right coronary artery; lower lobe of lung; Descending thoracic aorta / Top expressed in: molar; gastrula; renal corpuscle; endothelial cell of lymphatic vessel; epithelium of lens; external carotid artery; internal carotid artery; ciliary body; decidua; conjunctival fornix; More reference expression data
BioGPS	More reference expression data
Gene ontology
Molecular function	G protein-coupled receptor activity; signal transducer activity; thrombin-activated receptor activity; G-protein beta-subunit binding; protein binding; G-protein alpha-subunit binding; signaling receptor binding
Cellular component	integral component of membrane; platelet dense tubular network; late endosome; Golgi apparatus; postsynaptic membrane; membrane; neuromuscular junction; plasma membrane; integral component of plasma membrane; extracellular region; cell surface; early endosome; caveola
Biological process	negative regulation of neuron apoptotic process; positive regulation of collagen biosynthetic process; hemostasis; establishment of synaptic specificity at neuromuscular junction; release of sequestered calcium ion into cytosol; platelet dense granule organization; regulation of sensory perception of pain; thrombin-activated receptor signaling pathway; positive regulation of cell migration; positive regulation of cytosolic calcium ion concentration; anatomical structure morphogenesis; blood coagulation; positive regulation of release of sequestered calcium ion into cytosol; platelet activation; phospholipase C-activating G protein-coupled receptor signaling pathway; positive regulation of cysteine-type endopeptidase activity involved in apoptotic process; response to lipopolysaccharide; positive regulation of transcription, DNA-templated; protein kinase C-activating G protein-coupled receptor signaling pathway; positive regulation of blood coagulation; response to wounding; positive regulation of vasoconstriction; positive regulation of cell population proliferation; connective tissue replacement involved in inflammatory response wound healing; positive regulation of ERK1 and ERK2 cascade; regulation of interleukin-1 beta production; positive regulation of I-kappaB kinase/NF-kappaB signaling; homeostasis of number of cells within a tissue; positive regulation of phosphatidylinositol 3-kinase signaling; regulation of blood coagulation; inflammatory response; negative regulation of glomerular filtration; activation of cysteine-type endopeptidase activity involved in apoptotic process; positive regulation of smooth muscle contraction; positive regulation of MAPK cascade; negative regulation of cell population proliferation; negative regulation of renin secretion into blood stream; signal transduction; positive regulation of calcium ion transport; positive regulation of Rho protein signal transduction; positive regulation of cytosolic calcium ion concentration involved in phospholipase C-activating G protein-coupled signaling pathway; trans-synaptic signaling by endocannabinoid, modulating synaptic transmission; positive regulation of GTPase activity; cell-cell junction maintenance; G protein-coupled receptor signaling pathway; positive regulation of receptor signaling pathway via JAK-STAT
Sources:Amigo / QuickGO
Orthologs
Databases	NCBI: entry; OMA: entry
Species	Human	Mouse
Entrez	2149	14062
Ensembl	ENSG00000181104	ENSMUSG00000048376
UniProt	P25116	P30558
RefSeq (mRNA)	NM_001992; NM_001311313	NM_010169
RefSeq (protein)	NP_001298242; NP_001983	NP_034299
Location (UCSC)	Chr 5: 76.72 – 76.74 Mb	Chr 13: 95.74 – 95.75 Mb
PubMed search
- Wikidata
View/Edit Human	View/Edit Mouse

Proteinase-activated receptor 1 (PAR1) also known as protease-activated receptor 1, coagulation factor II receptor and thrombin receptor is a protein that in humans is encoded by the F2R gene. PAR1 is a G protein-coupled receptor and one of four protease-activated receptors involved in the regulation of thrombotic response. Highly expressed in platelets and endothelial cells, PAR1 plays a key role in mediating the interplay between coagulation and inflammation, which is important in the pathogenesis of inflammatory and fibrotic lung diseases. It is also involved both in disruption and maintenance of endothelial barrier integrity, through interaction with either thrombin or activated protein C, respectively.

== Structure ==
PAR1 is a transmembrane G-protein-coupled receptor (GPCR) that shares much of its structure with the other protease-activated receptors. These characteristics include having seven transmembrane alpha helices, four extracellular loops and three intracellular loops. PAR1 specifically contains 425 amino acid residues arranged for optimal binding of thrombin at its extracellular N-terminus. The C-terminus of PAR1 is located on the intracellular side of the cell membrane as part of its cytoplasmic tail.

== Signal transduction pathway ==
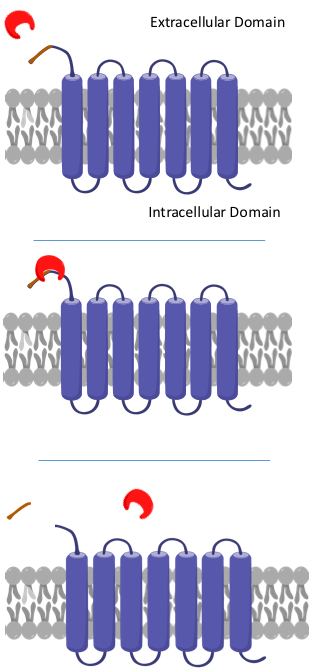
This image gives an overview of the cleavage of PAR1 by thrombin. Thrombin, in red, binds to the cleavage site at the extracellular N-terminus of PAR1. Thrombin cleaves the peptide bond between Arg-41 and Ser-42 to reveal a tethered ligand at the new N-terminus and the cleaved peptide, in orange, is released outside of the cell.

=== Activation ===
PAR1 is activated when the terminal 41 amino acids of its N-terminus are cleaved by thrombin, a serine protease. Thrombin recognizes PAR1 by a Lysine-Aspartate-Proline-Arginine-Serine sequence at the N-terminal, where it cuts the peptide bond between Arginine-41 and Serine-42. The affinity of thrombin to this specific cleavage site in PAR1 is further aided by secondary interactions between thrombin's exosite and an acidic region of amino acid residues located C-terminal to Ser-42. This proteolytic cleavage is irreversible and the loose peptide, often referred to as parstatin, is then released outside of the cell. The newly revealed N-terminus acts as a tethered ligand that binds to a binding region between extracellular loops 3 and 4 of PAR1, therefore activating the protein. The binding instigates conformational changes in the protein that ultimately allow for the binding of G-proteins to sites on the intracellular region of PAR1.

=== Signalling ===
Once cleaved, PAR1 can activate G-proteins that bind to several locations on its intracellular loops. For example, PAR1 in conjunction with PAR4 can couple to and activate G-protein G_{12/13} which in turn activates Rho and Rho kinase. This pathway leads to the quick alteration of platelet shape due to actin contractions that lead to platelet mobility, as well as the release of granules which are both necessary for platelet aggregation. Coupling can also occur with G_{q}, leading to phospholipase C-β activation; this pathway results in the stimulation of protein kinase C (PKC) which impacts platelet activation.

Additionally, both PAR1 and PAR4 can couple to G-protein q which stimulates intracellular movement for Calcium ions that serve as second messengers for platelet activation. This also activates protein kinase C which stimulates platelet aggregation and therefore blood coagulation further down the pathway.

=== Termination ===
The phosphorylation of PAR1's cytoplasmic tail and subsequent binding to arrestin uncouples the protein from G protein signaling. These phosphorylated PAR1s are transported back into the cell via endosomes where they are sent to Golgi bodies. The cleaved PAR1s are then sorted and transported to lysosomes where they are degraded. This internalization and degradation process is necessary for the termination of receptor signaling.

In order to regain thrombin responsiveness, PAR1 must be replenished in the cell surface. Uncleaved PAR1 in the cell membrane gets bound by the AP2 adaptor complex at a tyrosine motif on the intracellular C-terminus, which stimulates the endocytosis of the unactivated PAR1. It is then stored in clathrin-coated vesicles within the cytosol and ultimately protected from proteolysis. This ensures that there is a constant supply of uncleaved PAR1 that can be cycled into the plasma membrane independent of PAR1 reproduction, thus resensitizing the cell to thrombin and resetting the signal transduction pathway.

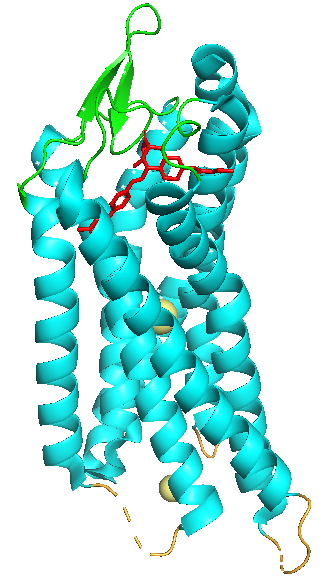
This is a rendering of PAR1's structure when bound to an antagonist, Vorapaxar. The light blue structures represent the seven transmembrane alpha helices of PAR1. The green structures represent the extracellular loops and the orange structures represent the intracellular loops. The red molecule is Vorapaxar. C-terminal tail not pictured.

== Ligands ==
=== Agonists ===
Finding selective agonists for PAR1 has also been a topic of interest for researchers. A synthetic SFLLRN peptide has been found to serve as an agonist for PAR1. The SFLLRN peptide mimics the first six residues of the N-terminal tethered ligand of activated PAR1 and binds to the same binding site on the second extracellular loop. So, even in the absence of thrombin, SFLLRN binding can garner a response from cleaved or uncleaved PAR1.

=== Antagonists ===
Selective antagonists for the PAR1 receptor have been developed for use as anti-clotting agents.

- SCH-79797
- Vorapaxar, sold under the brand name Zontivity, is a first-in-class anti-platelet drug used in the treatment of heart disease in patients with a history of heart attacks and peripheral artery disease. Vorapaxar has been recently shown to attenuate the neutrophilic inflammatory response to Streptococcus pneumoniae by reducing levels of pro-inflammatory cytokines such as IL-1β and chemokines CXCL1, CCL2 and CCL7. PAR1 is inhibited by Vorapaxar when the molecule binds to a binding pocket between extracellular loop 2 and 3 of the PAR1 where it stabilizes the inactivated protein structure and prevents the switch to the active conformation.

== See also ==
- Protease-activated receptor
