= PPPA (drug) =

Chemical compound

Clinical data
- ATC code: None

Identifiers
- IUPAC name: 3-Phenoxy-3-phenyl-1-propanamine
- CAS Number: 48166-95-6
- PubChem CID: 12807485
- ChemSpider: 14379241
- UNII: EE55YAQ6HN

Chemical and physical data
- Formula: C_{15}H_{17}NO
- Molar mass: 227.307 g·mol^{−1}
- 3D model (JSmol): Interactive image
- SMILES: c1ccc(cc1)C(CCN)Oc2ccccc2
- InChI: InChI=1S/C15H17NO/c16-12-11-15(13-7-3-1-4-8-13)17-14-9-5-2-6-10-14/h1-10,15H,11-12,16H2; Key:XYWLZHPZECQHMB-UHFFFAOYSA-N

PPPA, or 3-phenoxy-3-phenylpropan-1-amine, is a drug which is described as an antidepressant. It was derived by Eli Lilly from the antihistamine diphenhydramine, a diphenylmethane derivative with additional properties as a selective serotonin reuptake inhibitor (SSRI), and has been the basis for the subsequent discovery of a number of other antidepressant drugs.

== List of PPPA derivatives ==
- Atomoxetine ((3R)-N-methyl-3-(2-methylphenoxy)-3-phenylpropan-1-amine) — NRI
- Fluoxetine (N-methyl-3-(4-(trifluoromethyl)phenoxy)-3-phenylpropan-1-amine) — SSRI
- N-Methyl-PPPA (N-methyl-3-phenoxy-3-phenylpropan-1-amine) — SNRI
- Nisoxetine (N-methyl-3-(2-methoxyphenoxy)-3-phenylpropan-1-amine) — NRI
- Norfluoxetine (3-(4-(trifluoromethyl)phenoxy)-3-phenylpropan-1-amine) — SSRI
- Seproxetine ((S)-3-(4-(trifluoromethyl)phenoxy)-3-phenylpropan-1-amine) — SSRI

Structurally related drugs include dapoxetine, duloxetine, edivoxetine, femoxetine, paroxetine, reboxetine, and viloxazine, all of which act, similarly, as monoamine reuptake inhibitors, and most of which are, again similarly, antidepressants.

Zimelidine is an antidepressant and SSRI which was derived from the antihistamine pheniramine, which, similarly to its analogues brompheniramine and chlorpheniramine, possesses SNRI properties. Fluvoxamine, another antidepressant and SSRI, was developed from the antihistamine tripelennamine, which possesses SNDRI actions.

== See also ==
- Development and discovery of SSRI drugs
- Aryloxypropanamine scaffold
- Lometraline
