= Bryan Molloy =

Scottish chemist and inventor (1939-2004)

Bryan Barnet Molloy (30 March 1939 – 20 May 2004) was a Scottish-French chemist, known notably for helping to invent the antidepressant Prozac, a name for fluoxetine. Prozac was introduced in 1988, and has been the world's leading antidepressant.

== Early life ==
He was born in Broughty Ferry, in the east of Dundee. He received a BSc degree in Chemistry in 1960 from the University of St Andrews, gaining a PhD in 1963.

== Career ==
He moved to the US in 1963, working on research at three universities for three years, including Imperial College London and Columbia University (with Gilbert Stork, organic chemistry). In his professional career, he researched the neurotransmitter acetylcholine, and its effect on the heart.

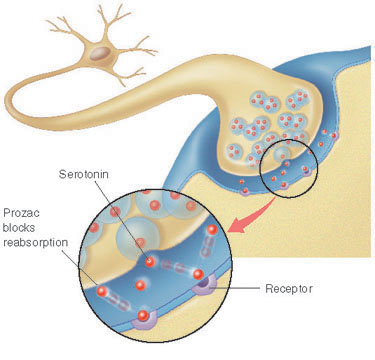
Mechanism of prozac

=== Prozac ===
He worked with David T. Wong and Klaus Schmiegel. Tricyclic antidepressants had been introduced in the 1950s, and further antidepressants included monoamine oxidase inhibitors (MAOIs); these had side-effects. In 1971, Wong and Molloy went to a lecture in Indianapolis given by Solomon H. Snyder, a neuroscientist at Johns Hopkins University. This gave them a method to test new compounds similar to antihistamines found by Molloy, one being fluoxetine.

Fluoxetine hydrochloride (3-aryloxy-3-phenylpropylamine, an aryloxyphenylpropylamine), the first of the selective serotonin reuptake inhibitors (SSRIs), was inventor in 1972, and made public in 1974; work had begun with Robert Rathbun in 1970. Other well-known SSRIs would be sertraline (Zoloft) from Pfizer, and paroxetine (Paxil or Seroxat) from GSK. Fluoxetine is on the WHO Model List of Essential Medicines.

He later worked on cardiovascular disease and cardiac arrhythmia, and phenethylamines as antidepressants. He retired in 2001.

== Personal life ==
He married Kay Koch in 1971. They lived on a farm in Indiana. He had a pilot's licence. He became a US citizen in 1990. He died in 2004, aged 65, in Marion County, Indiana. He was listed in the National Inventors Hall of Fame on 18 September 1999 at Akron, Ohio.

== See also ==
- Stewart Adams (chemist), inventor of ibuprofen
