= F2RL3 =

Protein-coding gene in the species Homo sapiens

Identifiers
- Aliases: F2RL3, PAR4, F2R like thrombin/trypsin receptor 3, F2R like thrombin or trypsin receptor 3
- External IDs: OMIM: 602779; MGI: 1298207; GeneCards: F2RL3
Available structures
PDB	Ortholog search: PDBe RCSB
PDB	List of PDB id codes 2ZPK, 3QDZ

Gene location (Human)
Chr.	Chromosome 19 (human)
Band	19p13.11	Start	16,888,999 bp
Band	19p13.11	End	16,892,606 bp

Gene location (Mouse)
Chr.	Chromosome 8 (mouse)
Band	8 35.08 cM|8 B3.3	Start	73,488,508 bp
Band	8 35.08 cM|8 B3.3	End	73,490,502 bp
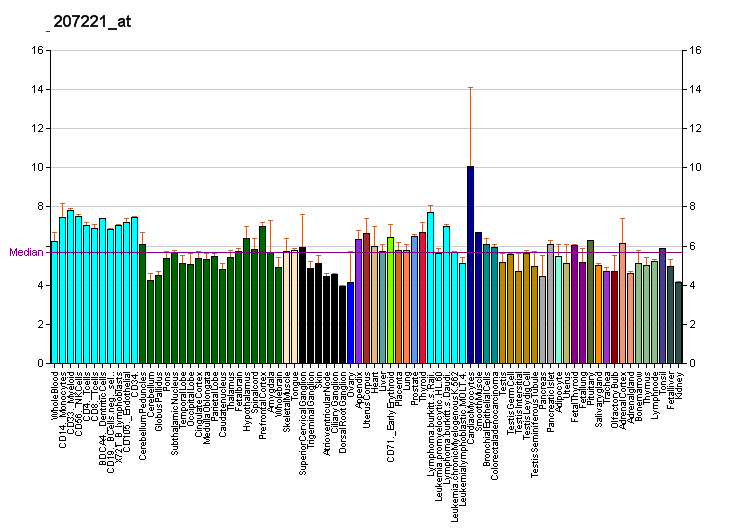
RNA expression pattern
Bgee	Human / Mouse (ortholog); Top expressed in: right lung; upper lobe of left lung; left lobe of thyroid gland; subcutaneous adipose tissue; islet of Langerhans; right lobe of thyroid gland; lactiferous gland; monocyte; body of stomach; transverse colon / Top expressed in: left lobe of liver; right lobe of liver; vasculature; vasculature of organ; choroid plexus; embryo; spleen; yolk sac; quadriceps femoris muscle; placenta; More reference expression data
BioGPS	More reference expression data
Gene ontology
Molecular function	thrombin-activated receptor activity; signal transducer activity; G protein-coupled receptor activity
Cellular component	integral component of membrane; extracellular region; integral component of plasma membrane; membrane; plasma membrane
Biological process	platelet activation; hemostasis; phospholipase C-activating G protein-coupled receptor signaling pathway; thrombin-activated receptor signaling pathway; positive regulation of release of sequestered calcium ion into cytosol; platelet dense granule organization; response to wounding; signal transduction; blood coagulation; positive regulation of Rho protein signal transduction; positive regulation of cytosolic calcium ion concentration involved in phospholipase C-activating G protein-coupled signaling pathway; G protein-coupled receptor signaling pathway
Sources:Amigo / QuickGO
Orthologs
Databases	NCBI: entry; OMA: entry
Species	Human	Mouse
Entrez	9002	14065
Ensembl	ENSG00000127533	ENSMUSG00000050147
UniProt	Q96RI0	O88634
RefSeq (mRNA)	NM_003950	NM_007975
RefSeq (protein)	NP_003941	NP_032001
Location (UCSC)	Chr 19: 16.89 – 16.89 Mb	Chr 8: 73.49 – 73.49 Mb
PubMed search
- Wikidata
View/Edit Human	View/Edit Mouse

Protease-activated receptor 4 (PAR-4), also known as coagulation factor II (thrombin) receptor-like 3, is a protein that in humans is encoded by the F2RL3 gene.

== Function ==
Coagulation factor II (thrombin) receptor-like 3 (F2RL3) is a member of the large family of 7-transmembrane-region receptors that couple to guanosine-nucleotide-binding proteins. F2RL3 is also a member of the protease-activated receptor family. F2RL3 is activated by proteolytic cleavage of its extracellular amino terminus. The new amino terminus functions as a tethered ligand and activates the receptor. F2RL3 is activated by thrombin and trypsin.

== See also ==
- Protease-activated receptor
