= Klaus Schmiegel =

Co-inventor of Prozac

- Born: June 28, 1939 (age 87); Chemnitz, Germany
- Education: University of Michigan (B.S.); Dartmouth College (A.M.); Stanford University (Ph.D.)
- Known for: Inventing fluoxetine, the active ingredient in Prozac
- Awards: National Inventors Hall of Fame, 1999; American Innovator Award, 1999
- Scientific career
- Fields: Chemistry

Klaus Schmiegel (born June 28, 1939), is a German chemist best known for his work in organic chemistry, which led to the invention of Prozac, a widely used antidepressant.

== Biography ==
=== Early life and education ===
Klaus Schmiegel was born in Chemnitz, Germany on June 28, 1939. After he immigrated to the United States in 1951, Schmiegel received a B.S. in chemistry from the University of Michigan, an A.M. in organic chemistry from Dartmouth College, and a Ph.D. in organic chemistry from Stanford University. His strong educational background secured him a prestigious position as a senior organic chemist at Eli Lilly, a prominent pharmaceutical company.

=== Primary accomplishment ===
At Eli Lilly in the 1960s, Schmiegel and Bryan Molloy, with the help of David Wong, searched for a compound to combat depression. Because depression and similar psychiatric disorders are associated with reduced serotonin levels, they focused their approach on prohibiting serotonin reuptake. During a regular nerve signal transmission, a neurotransmitter such as serotonin travels from a presynaptic neuron to a postsynaptic neuron; the neurotransmitter returns to the presynaptic neuron after fulfilling its function, the reuptake process. Therefore, slowing and diminishing serotonin reuptake boosts serotonin levels in the brain.

The scientists based their search on the template of the antihistamine drug diphenhydramine hydrochloride, commonly known as Benadryl. After many failures, the research team synthesized a group of compounds called aryloxyphenylpropylamines. Upon testing, a member of the group, fluoxetine hydrochloride, proved to affect only the neurotransmitter serotonin. This compound became the first selective serotonin reuptake inhibitor (SSRI) and the active ingredient in the vastly popular and effective drug Prozac.

=== Prozac, the "Drug Of Despair" ===
Eli Lilly recognized the potential of its new drug, but the company first tested it as a high blood pressure medication, an anti-obesity drug, and a remedy for severe depression. After those testing failures, Eli Lilly succeeded in treating five mildly depressed people; fluoxetine had found its niche. Eli Lilly announced its findings in 1974 and launched Prozac in 1987 after receiving FDA approval.

The “wonder drug” replaced earlier medications, tricyclic antidepressants, which were less effective with serious side effects such as headaches, blurred vision and hypertension. By 1999, Prozac was bringing in $2.5 billion per year, 25% of Eli Lilly's revenue. The drug helped erase the stigma of depression, inspiring celebrities and public figures to flaunt rather than hide their sufferings.

Prozac, which is recognized by Fortune magazine as a “Product of the Century,” has few side effects; it has been widely beneficial for those suffering from depression, obsessive compulsive disorders, panic disorders, eating disorders and premenstrual dysphoric disorders. However, some contend that Prozac has been doled out too liberally—it has even been prescribed for animals. Peer drugs, including Zoloft and Paxil, which are also SSRIs, have experienced similar successes.

Unfortunately for Eli Lilly, its patent on Prozac expired in 2001, causing massive revenue losses. The company hopes to bounce back with its newest drug, Cymbalta, a painkiller and an antidepressant combined.

=== Other scientific work ===
Schmiegel is listed as an inventor on all eighteen of his patents, and his patents are assigned to his company, Eli Lilly. Schmiegel's chemical work concentrated on supplements to bolster the health of animals (growth promotion), weight control agents, and antidepressants.

=== Awards and recognition ===
In 1999, both Schmiegel and Molloy were inducted into the National Inventors Hall of Fame for their fluoxetine compound that revolutionized depression treatment. In addition, the same year, the pair received the U.S. Department of Commerce's Ronald H. Brown American Innovator award, honoring their great contribution to society.

=== Later years ===
Schmiegel worked for Eli Lilly until his retirement in 1993. Though Schmiegel is retired, he still lives in Indianapolis near the Eli Lilly headquarters.
