= Compound 9 (opioid antagonist) =

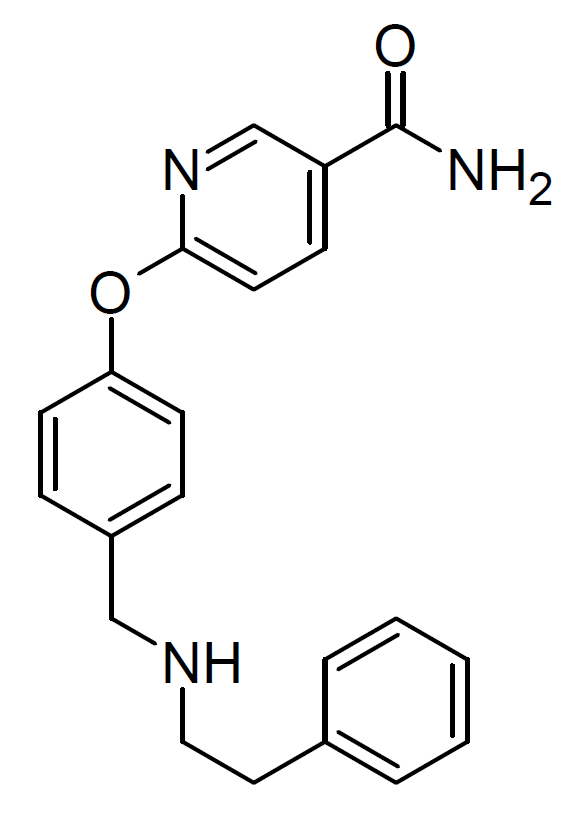

Identifiers
- IUPAC name: 6-[4-[(2-phenylethylamino)methyl]phenoxy]pyridine-3-carboxamide
- CAS Number: 676494-79-4
- PubChem CID: 44434058
- ChemSpider: 23296584
- ChEMBL: ChEMBL238361

Chemical and physical data
- Formula: C_{21}H_{21}N_{3}O_{2}
- Molar mass: 347.418 g·mol^{−1}
- 3D model (JSmol): Interactive image
- SMILES: C1=CC=C(C=C1)CCNCC2=CC=C(C=C2)OC3=NC=C(C=C3)C(=O)N
- InChI: InChI=1S/C21H21N3O2/c22-21(25)18-8-11-20(24-15-18)26-19-9-6-17(7-10-19)14-23-13-12-16-4-2-1-3-5-16/h1-11,15,23H,12-14H2,(H2,22,25); Key:XPIWSPZHJZLUGI-UHFFFAOYSA-N

Compound 9 is a highly potent non-selective opioid antagonist. It blocks all three of the μ, δ and κ opioid receptors with highest affinity at μ and weakest at κ. It has been researched as a potential treatment agent for opioid overdose associated with highly potent opioids such as carfentanil, which often fails to respond to conventional antidotes such as naloxone due to its high binding affinity at the mu opioid receptor.

== See also ==
- AT-076
- Diprenorphine
- LY-255582
