= Protease-activated receptor =

Subfamily of related G protein-coupled receptors

coagulation factor II thrombin receptor

Identifiers
- Symbol: F2R
- Alt. symbols: TR; HTR; CF2R; PAR1; PAR-1
- NCBI gene: 2149
- HGNC: 3537
- OMIM: 187930
- PDB: 3BEF
- RefSeq: NM_001992
- UniProt: P25116

Other data
- Locus: Chr. 5 q13.3
Search for
- Structures: Swiss-model
- Domains: InterPro

F2R like trypsin receptor 1

Identifiers
- Symbol: F2RL1
- Alt. symbols: PAR2, GPR11
- NCBI gene: 2150
- HGNC: 3538
- OMIM: 600933
- PDB: 5NDD
- RefSeq: NM_005242
- UniProt: P55085

Other data
- Locus: Chr. 5 q13.3
Search for
- Structures: Swiss-model
- Domains: InterPro

coagulation factor II thrombin receptor like 2

Identifiers
- Symbol: F2RL2
- Alt. symbols: PAR3; PAR-3
- NCBI gene: 2151
- HGNC: 3539
- OMIM: 601919
- PDB: 2PUX
- RefSeq: NM_004101
- UniProt: O00254

Other data
- Locus: Chr. 5 q13.3
Search for
- Structures: Swiss-model
- Domains: InterPro

F2R like thrombin or trypsin receptor 3

Identifiers
- Symbol: F2RL3
- Alt. symbols: PAR4
- NCBI gene: 9002
- HGNC: 3540
- OMIM: 602779
- PDB: 2PV9
- RefSeq: NM_003950
- UniProt: Q96RI0

Other data
- Locus: Chr. 19 p13.11
Search for
- Structures: Swiss-model
- Domains: InterPro

Protease-activated receptors (PAR) are a subfamily of related G protein-coupled receptors that are activated by cleavage of part of their extracellular domain. They are highly expressed in platelets, and also on endothelial cells, fibroblasts, immune cells, myocytes, neurons, and tissues that line the gastrointestinal tract.

Protease-activated receptors, or PARs, are not to be mistaken with PAR proteins, a group of regulators of cellular polarity named after their associated partitioning phenotype.

== Classification ==
There are four mammalian members of the protease-activated receptor (PAR) family: PAR1 – encoded by the gene F2R, PAR2 – F2RL1, PAR3 – F2RL2 and PAR4 – F2RL3, each of these genes has its locus on chromosome 5 except that of PAR4, which is on chromosome 19. The protease specificities, expression patterns, and functions of each PAR vary across a range of tissues and cell types. They are also members of the seven-transmembrane G-protein-coupled receptor superfamily, and are expressed throughout the body.

== History ==
When scientists were researching the process of blood clotting in the late 1980s, they made the discovery of protease-activated receptors (PARs). A novel protein that was activated by thrombin, a crucial part of the clotting cascade, was discovered by a research team at the University of California, San Francisco in 1991. The team was directed by Shaun Coughlin. This protein, which was eventually given the designation protease-activated receptor 1 (PAR1), was the first to be recognized as a member of the PAR family.

A second thrombin-activated protein, later known as PAR3, was identified in 1994. Later research revealed that PAR3 works as a cofactor for PAR4 but lacks a useful intracellular domain. A third member of the PAR family, known as PAR2, was discovered as a protein triggered by in 1996.

== Activation ==
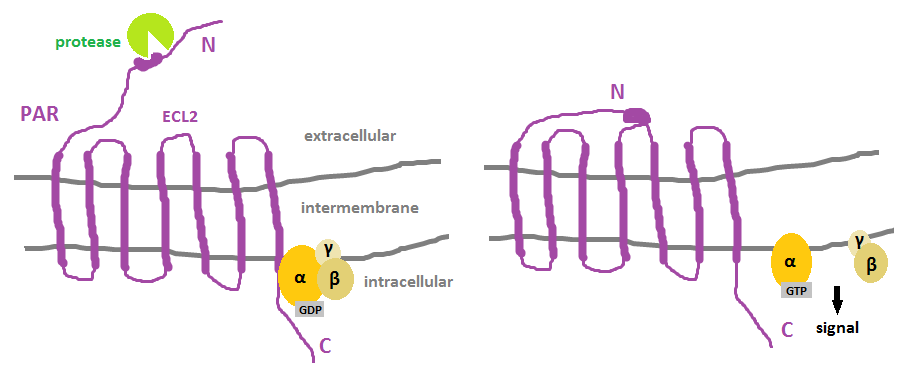
Signal transduction by activation of PAR

Protease activated receptors are integral membrane proteins that are coupled to G-proteins and are activated by proteolytic cleavage of the amino terminal sequence that exposes a new N-terminal sequence functions as a tethered ligand, which bind a conserved region on extracellular loop 2 (ECL2). Such binding causes activation of intracellular pathways and the specific change in conformation of the PAR. The most effective activator of PAR4 is thrombin. However, trypsin and factor Xa activate PAR4 by cleaving the receptor at various places in its N-terminal domain. Four types of PAR receptors have been identified by molecular cloning, and classified according to the main enzyme that is able to activate it. It has been determined that a large group of proteases cleave and activate PARs receptors, including various endogenous proteases from: a) the coagulation cascade, b) inflammatory cells, and c) the digestive tract. On the other hand, PARs can be specifically cleaved and irreversibly activated even by exogenous proteases originated from insects, bacteria or plants and fungi. The wide distribution of PARs in a variety of cells supports the idea that they are involved in many process related with the gastrointestinal physiology and cardiovascular physiology. Although the proteolysis is the main mechanism for PAR activation, it is well known that a synthetic peptide (SLIGKV) that mimics the new N-terminal sequence produced after the cleavage, activates PAR-2 receptors without its proteolytic processing. In this sense, here we report that TFF3 isolated from human breast milk activates PAR-2 receptors of intestinal epithelial cells HT-29. These findings suggest that TFF3 activates intestinal epithelial cells through G-protein-coupled PAR-2, and could actively participate in the immune system of breastfed babies inducing the production of peptides related to innate defense, such as defensins and cytokines.

PARs are activated by the action of serine proteases such as thrombin (acts on PARs 1, 3 and 4) and trypsin (PAR 2). These enzymes cleave the N-terminus of the receptor, which in turn acts as a tethered ligand. In the cleaved state, part of the receptor itself acts as the agonist, causing a physiological response.

Most of the PAR family act through the actions of G-proteins i (cAMP inhibitory), 12/13 (Rho and Ras activation) and q (calcium signalling) to cause cellular actions.

== Function ==
PARs play a role in a multitude of physiological processes such as hemostasis, thrombosis, inflammation, and pain sensation. The cellular effects of thrombin are mediated by protease-activated receptors (PARs). Endothelial PARs participate in the regulation of vascular tone and permeability while in vascular smooth muscle they mediate contraction, proliferation, and hypertrophy. In endothelial cells PARs play a key role in promotion vascular barrier function as they provide a positive signals for endothelial adhesion molecules (vascular cell adhesion molecule-1 or VCAM-1, intercellular adhesion molecule-1 or ICAM-1, and E-selectin). PARs contribute to the pro-inflammatory response. For example PAR4 induces leukocyte migration and PAR2 helps macrophages to produce cytokines such as interleukin-8 (IL-8). Recent research has also implicated these novel receptors in muscle growth and bone cell differentiation and proliferation.

== Tissue distribution ==
PAR1, PAR3, and PAR4 are activated by thrombin. There are species-specific differences in thrombin receptor expression in platelets and other cell types, in which differences in thrombin concentrations may considerably affect platelet activation of distinct PARs. As seen in human platelets, PAR1 and PAR4 are the functional thrombin receptors, whereas PAR3 and PAR4 are functional thrombin receptors in mouse platelets

Thrombin receptors are also differentially expressed in cell types, e.g. PAR1 is expressed in fibroblasts, smooth muscle cells, sensory neurons and glial cells, whereas the other two are less clearly defined.

There are various roles depending on location of activation. Fibroblasts and smooth muscle cells induces growth factor and matrix production, migration and proliferation. Sensory neurons induces proliferation and release of neuroactive agents.

== Regulation of signaling ==
=== Desensitization and internalization ===
Initial desensitization due to rapid phosphorylation of activated receptors by kinases, which increases affinity for arrestin. Arrestin prevents protein-receptor interaction and the receptor becomes dephosphorylated and inhibited from signaling. This is a sufficient and rapid form of termination of PAR signaling. Irreversibly activated PAR1 is internalized and terminated from further signaling by clathrin-mediated endocytosis and lysosome degradation, preventing replenishment at the cell surface.

Biased signaling is a form of regulating thrombin receptors by allowing specific ligands to activate certain pathways. It is known that thrombin activates PAR1 signaling, which can activate many pathways involving the G-protein-coupled receptors, however, with biased signaling it is different. Biased antagonists made for thrombin receptors are important for therapeutical therapies that can treat different inflammatory-related diseases. There have been studies of PAR-1 inhibitors, vorapaxar and atopaxar, which could provide an alternative treatment for atherothrombotic disease.

== See also ==
- Protease-activated receptor 1
- Protease-activated receptor 2
- Protease-activated receptor 3
