= Himbacine =

Chemical compound

Clinical data
- ATC code: none

Identifiers
- IUPAC name: (3aR,4R,4aS,8aR,9aS)- 4-{(E)-[(2R,6S)- 1,6-dimethylpiperidin- 2-yl]vinyl}- 3-methyldecahydronaphtho[2,3-c]furan- 1(3H)-one
- CAS Number: 6879-74-9
- PubChem CID: 6436265
- IUPHAR/BPS: 324
- ChemSpider: 4940913
- UNII: M17C7V122D
- ChEBI: CHEBI:5720
- ChEMBL: ChEMBL277642
- CompTox Dashboard (EPA): DTXSID401027483

Chemical and physical data
- Formula: C_{22}H_{35}NO_{2}
- Molar mass: 345.527 g·mol^{−1}
- 3D model (JSmol): Interactive image
- SMILES: O=C3O[C@H]([C@@H]4[C@H](/C=C/[C@@H]1N(C)[C@@H](C)CCC1)[C@@H]2[C@H](CCCC2)C[C@H]34)C
- InChI: InChI=1S/C22H35NO2/c1-14-7-6-9-17(23(14)3)11-12-19-18-10-5-4-8-16(18)13-20-21(19)15(2)25-22(20)24/h11-12,14-21H,4-10,13H2,1-3H3/b12-11+/t14-,15-,16+,17+,18-,19+,20-,21+/m0/s1; Key:FMPNFDSPHNUFOS-LPJDIUFZSA-N

Himbacine is an alkaloid isolated from the bark of Australian magnolias. Himbacine has been synthesized using a Diels-Alder reaction as a key step. Himbacine's activity as a muscarinic receptor antagonist, with specificity for the muscarinic acetylcholine receptor M_{2}, made it a promising starting point in Alzheimer's disease research. The development of a muscarinic antagonist based on himbacine failed, but an analog, vorapaxar, has been approved by the FDA as a thrombin receptor antagonist.
