= Phenylaminotetralin =

Names
- IUPAC name (2S,4R)-N,N-dimethyl-4-phenyl-1,2,3,4-tetrahydronaphthalen-2-amine

Identifiers
3D model (JSmol)	Interactive image
ChemSpider	8281741
PubChem CID	69080096
- InChI: InChI=1S/C18H21N/c1-19(2)16-12-15-10-6-7-11-17(15)18(13-16)14-8-4-3-5-9-14/h3-11,16,18H,12-13H2,1-2H3/t16-,18-/m1/s1 Key: DXJUCAUQIHNOAF-SJLPKXTDSA-N; InChI=1S/C18H21N/c1-19(2)16-12-15-10-6-7-11-17(15)18(13-16)14-8-4-3-5-9-14/h3-11,16,18H,12-13H2,1-2H3/t16-,18-/m1/s1 Key: DXJUCAUQIHNOAF-SJLPKXTDSA-N
- SMILES: CN(C)[C@H]1CC(C2=CC=CC=C2C1)C3=CC=CC=C3

Properties
Chemical formula	C_{18}H_{21}N
Molar mass	251.373 g·mol^{−1}
- Except where otherwise noted, data are given for materials in their standard state (at 25 °C [77 °F], 100 kPa). Infobox references

Phenylaminotetralins are novel histamine receptor ligands. Binding assays determined that (-)-trans-H_{2}-PAT possessed the strongest binding affinity at the histamine H_{1} receptor.
