= Erotic Dream =

Trade fair in Greece

Erotic Dream, colloquially known as Erotica, was an annual adult entertainment convention held in Athens, Greece, first in 2011 and subsequently in 2012 and 2013. In 2011 a double convention was also held in Thessaloniki. It included dance and other shows and sold sex-related products. Porn actresses such as Adrianna Russo participated in the convention. George Chrysospathis was the fair's organizer.

The 2012 convention was the subject of a report by Reuters regarding the Greek economic crisis.
