= F2RL2 =

Protein-coding gene in the species Homo sapiens

Identifiers
- Aliases: F2RL2, PAR-3, PAR3, coagulation factor II thrombin receptor like 2
- External IDs: OMIM: 601919; MGI: 1298208; GeneCards: F2RL2

Gene location (Human)
| Chr. | Chromosome 5 (human) |
| Band | 5q13.3 | Start | 76,615,482 bp |
| Band | 5q13.3 | End | 76,623,413 bp |

Gene location (Mouse)
| Chr. | Chromosome 13 (mouse) |
| Band | 13 D1|13 50.38 cM | Start | 95,833,361 bp |
| Band | 13 D1|13 50.38 cM | End | 95,839,247 bp |
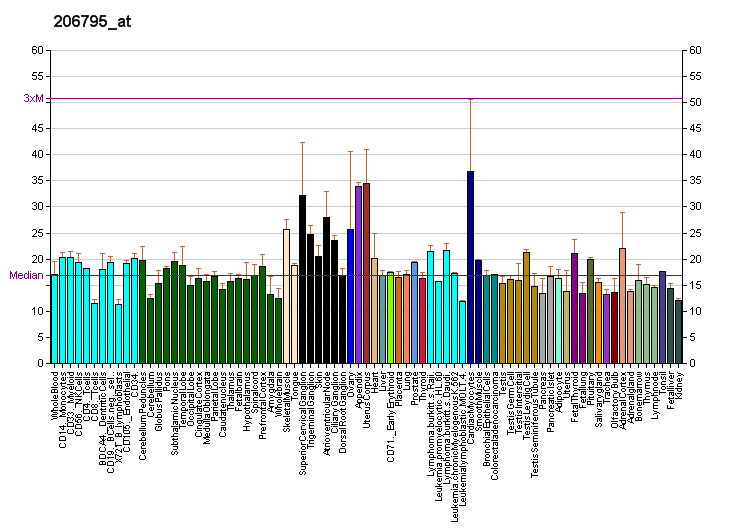
RNA expression pattern
| Bgee | Human / Mouse (ortholog); Top expressed in: stromal cell of endometrium; retinal pigment epithelium; skin of thigh; gallbladder; islet of Langerhans; testicle; skin of hip; gastric mucosa; smooth muscle tissue; nipple / Top expressed in: lumbar spinal ganglion; right lobe of liver; gastrula; blood; tibiofemoral joint; yolk sac; granulocyte; embryo; tail of embryo; submandibular gland; More reference expression data |
| BioGPS | More reference expression data |
Gene ontology
| Molecular function | thrombin-activated receptor activity; protein binding; signal transducer activity; phosphatidylinositol phospholipase C activity; G protein-coupled receptor activity |
| Cellular component | integral component of membrane; extracellular region; plasma membrane; integral component of plasma membrane; apical plasma membrane; membrane; protein-containing complex |
| Biological process | platelet activation; hemostasis; thrombin-activated receptor signaling pathway; blood coagulation; response to wounding; signal transduction; positive regulation of Rho protein signal transduction; positive regulation of cytosolic calcium ion concentration involved in phospholipase C-activating G protein-coupled signaling pathway; G protein-coupled receptor signaling pathway |
Sources:Amigo / QuickGO
Orthologs
| Databases | NCBI: entry; OMA: entry |
| Species | Human | Mouse |
| Entrez | 2151 | 14064 |
| Ensembl | ENSG00000164220 | ENSMUSG00000021675 |
| UniProt | O00254 | O08675 |
| RefSeq (mRNA) | NM_004101; NM_001256566 | NM_010170 |
| RefSeq (protein) | NP_001243495; NP_004092 | NP_034300 |
| Location (UCSC) | Chr 5: 76.62 – 76.62 Mb | Chr 13: 95.83 – 95.84 Mb |
| PubMed search |
- Wikidata
| View/Edit Human | View/Edit Mouse |

Protease activated receptor 3 (PAR-3) also known as coagulation factor II receptor-like 2 (F2RL2) and thrombin receptor-like 2, is a protein that in humans is encoded by the F2RL2 gene.

== Function ==
Coagulation factor II (thrombin) receptor-like 2 (F2RL2) is a member of the large family of 7-transmembrane receptors that couple to G proteins. F2RL2 is also a member of the protease-activated receptor family and activated by thrombin. F2RL2 is activated by proteolytic cleavage of its extracellular amino terminus. The new amino terminus functions as a tethered ligand and activates the receptor. F2RL2 is a cofactor for F2RL3 activation by thrombin. It mediates thrombin-triggered phosphoinositide hydrolysis and is expressed in a variety of tissues.

== See also ==
- Protease-activated receptor
