= LY-255582 =

Names
- Preferred IUPAC name 3-{(3R,4R)-1-[(3S)-3-Cyclohexyl-3-hydroxypropyl]-3,4-dimethylpiperidin-4-yl}phenol

Identifiers
| CAS Number | 119193-09-8 |
| 3D model (JSmol) | Interactive image |
| ChemSpider | 8081850 |
| PubChem CID | 9906198 |
| CompTox Dashboard (EPA) | DTXSID201045752 |
- InChI: InChI=1S/C22H35NO2/c1-17-16-23(13-11-21(25)18-7-4-3-5-8-18)14-12-22(17,2)19-9-6-10-20(24)15-19/h6,9-10,15,17-18,21,24-25H,3-5,7-8,11-14,16H2,1-2H3/t17-,21-,22+/m0/s1 Key: LVVHEFJXPXAUDD-BULFRSBZSA-N; InChI=1/C22H35NO2/c1-17-16-23(13-11-21(25)18-7-4-3-5-8-18)14-12-22(17,2)19-9-6-10-20(24)15-19/h6,9-10,15,17-18,21,24-25H,3-5,7-8,11-14,16H2,1-2H3/t17-,21-,22+/m0/s1 Key: LVVHEFJXPXAUDD-BULFRSBZBD
- SMILES: C[C@H]1CN(CC[C@@]1(C)C2=CC(=CC=C2)O)CC[C@@H](C3CCCCC3)O

Properties
| Chemical formula | C_{22}H_{35}NO_{2} |
| Molar mass | 345.527 g·mol^{−1} |
- Except where otherwise noted, data are given for materials in their standard state (at 25 °C [77 °F], 100 kPa). Infobox references

LY-255582 is a phenylpiperidine non-selective opioid antagonist. It has been shown to reduce ethanol consumption in experiments carried out on rats. It has also been shown to reduce food and water consumption in rats.

== See also ==
- Compound 9 (opioid antagonist)
- κ-Opioid receptor § Antagonists
- List of investigational antidepressants
