= David T. Wong =

Hong Kong-born American neuroscientist (born 1935)

- Known for: Fluoxetine
- Spouse: Christina Wong
- Children: Conrad Wong Mel Wong Vincent Wong

Academic background
- Education: National Taiwan University, Seattle Pacific University (BS) Oregon State University (MS) University of Oregon (Ph.D.)
- Thesis: Metabolism and ion transport of frog skin: biological effects of ouabain (1966)

Academic work
- Discipline: Neuropharmacology
- Institutions: Lilly Research Laboratories Indiana University School of Medicine

David T. Wong (born 1935 in Hong Kong) is a Hong Kong-born American neuroscientist. He is a former researcher with Eli Lilly and Company and an adjunct professor emeritus at the Indiana University School of Medicine. Wong is known for the invention of the antidepressant drugs fluoxetine and atomoxetine, the former more commonly known by its trade name Prozac.

Wong was born in Hong Kong, and began his undergraduate studies in chemistry at National Taiwan University. He came to Seattle Pacific College in 1957, and graduated in 1961. He then went on to graduate studies at Oregon State University, where he earned a master's degree in 1964 and later at the University of Oregon Medical School to receive his doctorate in 1966. After doing his postdoctoral research at the University of Pennsylvania, he joined Eli Lilly in 1968.

== Compounds ==
While at Lilly, Wong became most interested in agents that bind to Biogenic Amine Transporters (BAT). These compounds primarily affect functioning of the CNS and have known uses in the treatment of depression, ADHD, libido, obesity and addiction. Although such agents can be made to increase serotonin and norepinephrine, an example of a compound with a demonstrated affinity for the DAT is called N-methylatmoxetine [83015-25-2]. He helped to study:

LY125180

LY-255582

1. Fluoxetine
2. Atomoxetine
3. Duloxetine
4. Dapoxetine,
5. Nisoxetine
6. LY125180 [74515-39-2].
7. 6-CAT.
8. LY255582 [119193-09-8]
9. LY278584 (tropane analog of granisetron)

== Awards ==
1. Seattle Pacific College Centurions member (circa 1961) (Note: Wong joined the Centurions in his senior year at Seattle Pacific)
2. Pharmaceutical Manufacturers Association Discoverer's Award (1993)
3. Seattle Pacific University Alumnus of the Year (1998)
4. OSU Alumni Fellow (2003)
5. Indiana Living Legend (2008)
6. Prince Mahidol Award in Medicine (2011)

== Personal life ==
Wong met his wife, Christiana Lee, at the Oregon State University. They are devout Christians, and had three children together: Conrad, Mel, and Vincent Wong.
