= Intractable pain =

Medical phenomenon

Intractable pain, also called intractable pain syndrome (IPS), is a severe, constant, relentless, and debilitating pain that is not curable by any known means and which causes a house-bound or bed-bound state and early death if not adequately treated, usually with opioids and/or interventional procedures. It is not relieved by ordinary medical, surgical, nursing, or pharmaceutical measures. Unlike the more common chronic pain, it causes adverse biologic effects on the body's cardiovascular, hormone, and neurologic systems. Patients experience changes in testosterone, estrogen, cortisol, thyroid hormones, and/or pituitary hormones. Both men and women require testosterone, however many doctors neglect to test women for low testosterone. Untreated intractable pain can cause death.

== Legal definitions ==
The exact definition of intractable pain varies based on the source and is not generally agreed upon. Several states (California, Colorado, Florida, New Jersey, Texas, Virginia, Minnesota, and Washington) have passed intractable pain laws or guidelines. Texas, under their Intractable Pain Treatment Act, defines intractable pain as a state of pain for which the cause of the pain cannot be removed or otherwise treated and in the generally accepted course of medical practice, relief or cure of the cause of the pain is not possible or has not been found after reasonable efforts. Florida's intractable pain statute defines "intractable pain" as pain for which, in the generally accepted course of medical practice, the cause cannot be removed and otherwise treated.

== Treatments ==
Although intractable pain is not curable, there are treatments. The aim of IP treatment is to appreciate the pain caused by the root condition in order to minimize or reverse the neurological, endocrine, and cardiac changes. The specific treatments depend on the cause of the pain, the physician's preference, and the patient's health and preferences. These treatments can be used on their own, but are commonly combined with one another. Not every patient will respond to every treatment, but some more common treatments include:

- mu-Opioids – depending on the specific drug, opioids can be oral, transdermal, IV, intramuscular, subcutaneous, transmucosal, sublingual, intranasal, epidural, or intrathecal. Examples include morphine, hydromorphone, oxymorphone, hydrocodone, oxycodone, codeine, and buprenorphine.
- methadone – methadone is a mu-opioid, kappa-opioid, and NMDA receptor antagonist. It is used for neuropathic pain, however it is also useful for other types of pain, such as bone pain, and musculoskeletal pain.
- Surgical repair, such as spinal fusion for scoliosis
- Medical cannabis and/or cannabinoid therapy
- TENS unit
- Spinal cord stimulator (SCS) – utilizes the gate control theory to block painful signals by sending benign electrical signals along the nerve roots.
- Intrathecal pain pump – delivers a very small amount of the chosen medication directly to the thecal space (next to the spinal cord, even closer than an epidural)
- Epidural, nerve root, and/or trigger point corticosteroid injections

Some medications can be used to potentiate the primary treatment. This is most commonly done to boost the efficacy of opioids and minimize the dose of the opioid needed to alleviate the pain. Some of these treatments are also used on their own, examples include:

- Muscle relaxants
- Stimulants
- Mood stabilizers (anti-epileptics and antipsychotics), such as gabapentin (Neurontin/Gralise/Horizant), pregabalin (Lyrica), topiramate (Topamax), quetiapine (Seroquel), risperidone (Risperdal), aripiprazole (Abilify), paliperidone (Invega), iloperidone (Fanapt), ziprasidone (Geodon), lamotrigine (Lamictal), or valproic acid (Depakote).
- SSRI antidepressants, such as fluoxetine (Prozac/Sarafem), fluvoxamine (Luvox), paroxetine (Paxil), sertraline (Zoloft), citalopram (Celexa), or escitalopram (Lexapro)
- SNRI antidepressants, such as duloxetine (Cymbalta), venlafaxine (Effexor), desvenlafaxine (Pristiq, or milnacipran (Savella))
- NSAIDs – Ibuprofen (Advil/Motrin), naproxen (Naprosyn/Aleve), celecoxib (Celebrex), diclofenac (Voltaren/Flector), or ketorolac (Toradol)
- Physical therapy

== Causes ==
There are many painful conditions that can cause intractable pain disease. Not every patient with these conditions will develop intractable pain, but the following conditions are known to cause intractable pain in some patients:

- Failed back syndrome
- Scoliosis, kyphosis, kyphoscoliosis
- Complex regional pain syndrome (CRPS)
- Degenerative disk disease
- Rheumatoid arthritis
- Central pain syndrome (CPS)
- Migraine
- Ehlers–Danlos syndromes

== Notable figures ==
Although not recognized during their lifetimes, Elvis Presley, John F Kennedy and Howard Hughes are believed to have suffered from intractable pain.
