= Intractability =

Intractable may refer to:

- Intractable conflict, a form of complex, severe, and enduring conflict
- Intractable pain, pain which cannot be controlled/cured by any known treatment
- Intractable problem, in computational complexity theory
