= Duloxetine =

SNRI medication

Clinical data
- Pronunciation: /duːˈlɑːksəˌtin/ doo-LAHK-sə-teen
- Trade names: Cymbalta, others
- AHFS/Drugs.com: Monograph
- MedlinePlus: a604030
- License data: US DailyMed: Duloxetine
- Pregnancy category: AU: B3
- Routes of administration: By mouth
- Drug class: Serotonin–norepinephrine reuptake inhibitor (SNRI)
- ATC code: N06AX21 (WHO)

Legal status
- Legal status: AU: S4 (Prescription only); BR: Class C1 (Other controlled substances); CA: ℞-only; UK: POM (Prescription only); US: ℞-only; EU: Rx-only

Pharmacokinetic data
- Bioavailability: ~50% (32–80%)
- Protein binding: ~95%
- Metabolism: Liver, two P450 isozymes, CYP2D6 and CYP1A2
- Elimination half-life: 10–12 hours
- Excretion: 70% in urine, 20% in feces

Identifiers
- IUPAC name: (+)-(S)-N-Methyl-3-(naphthalen-1-yloxy)-3-(thiophen-2-yl)propan-1-amine
- CAS Number: 116539-59-4; as HCl: 136434-34-9
- PubChem CID: 60835
- IUPHAR/BPS: 202
- DrugBank: DB00476
- ChemSpider: 54822
- UNII: O5TNM5N07U; as HCl: 9044SC542W
- KEGG: D07880; as HCl: D01179
- ChEBI: CHEBI:36795; as HCl: CHEBI:31526
- ChEMBL: ChEMBL1175; as HCl: ChEMBL1200328
- PDB ligand: 29E (PDBe, RCSB PDB)
- CompTox Dashboard (EPA): DTXSID6048385
- ECHA InfoCard: 100.116.825

Chemical and physical data
- Formula: C_{18}H_{19}NOS
- Molar mass: 297.42 g·mol^{−1}
- 3D model (JSmol): Interactive image
- SMILES: CNCC[C@@H](C1=CC=CS1)OC2=CC=CC3=CC=CC=C32
- InChI: InChI=1S/C18H19NOS/c1-19-12-11-17(18-10-5-13-21-18)20-16-9-4-7-14-6-2-3-8-15(14)16/h2-10,13,17,19H,11-12H2,1H3/t17-/m0/s1; Key:ZEUITGRIYCTCEM-KRWDZBQOSA-N

Duloxetine, sold under the brand name Cymbalta among others, is a medication used to treat major depressive disorder, generalized anxiety disorder, obsessive–compulsive disorder, fibromyalgia, neuropathic pain, and other types of chronic pain. It is taken by mouth.

Duloxetine is a serotonin–norepinephrine reuptake inhibitor (SNRI). The precise mechanism for its antidepressant and anxiolytic effects is not known.

Common side effects include dry mouth, nausea, constipation, loss of appetite, drowsiness, sexual problems, and increased sweating. In some patients, sexual dysfunction may persist even after the drug is discontinued, a condition known as post-SSRI sexual dysfunction. Severe side effects include an increased risk of suicide, serotonin syndrome, mania, and liver problems. Antidepressant withdrawal syndrome may occur if stopped. Use during the later part of pregnancy may increase the risk of bleeding or cause complications for the fetus.

Duloxetine was approved for medical use in the United States and the European Union in 2004. It is available as a generic medication. In 2023, it was the 31st most commonly prescribed medication in the United States, with more than 18 million prescriptions.

== Medical uses ==
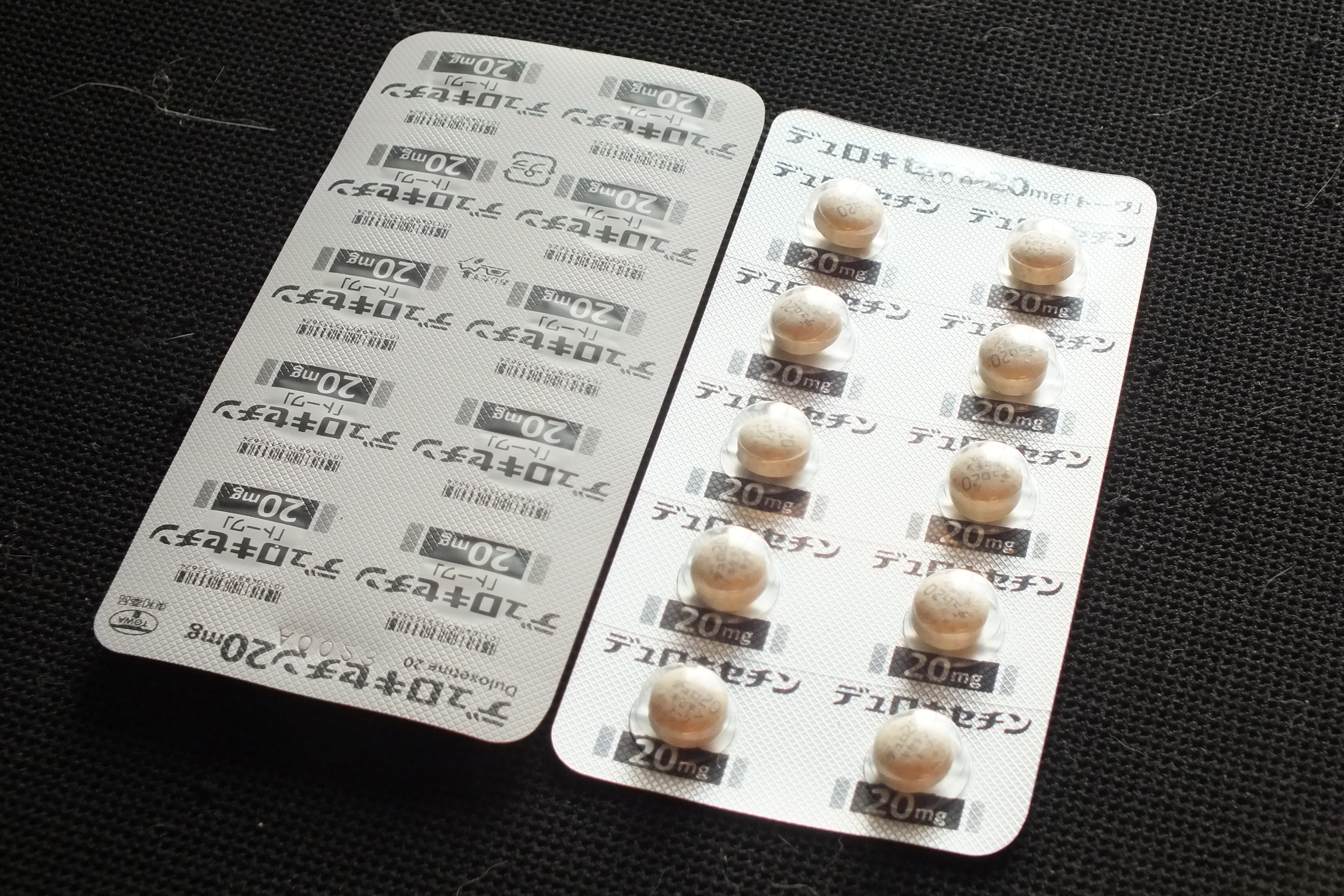
Duloxetine 20mg sold under the name Cymbalta in Japan

The main uses of duloxetine are in major depressive disorder, generalized anxiety disorder, neuropathic pain, chronic musculoskeletal pain, and fibromyalgia.

Duloxetine is recommended as a first-line agent for the treatment of chemotherapy-induced neuropathy by the American Society of Clinical Oncology, as a first-line therapy for fibromyalgia in the presence of mood disorders by the German Interdisciplinary Association for Pain Therapy, as a Grade B recommendation for the treatment of diabetic neuropathy by the American Association for Neurology and as a level A recommendation in certain neuropathic states by the European Federation of Neurological Societies.

=== Painful diabetic peripheral neuropathy ===
A 2014 Cochrane review concluded that duloxetine is beneficial in the treatment of diabetic neuropathy and fibromyalgia but that more comparative studies with other medicines are needed. The French medical journal Prescrire concluded that duloxetine is no better than other available agents and has a greater risk of side effects. Whereas duloxetine has shown efficacy in treating painful diabetic peripheral neuropathy by blocking late Nav 1.7 sodium ion channels and increasing norepinephrine, serotonin, and dopamine in the central nervous system and while improving mean NPRS scores and achieving a ≥50% pain response in more patients compared to placebo, it has been associated with potentially serious adverse reactions including hepatotoxicity, serotonin syndrome, severe skin reactions, increased risk of bleeding, increased blood pressure and sexual dysfunction.

=== Major depressive disorder ===
Duloxetine was approved for the treatment of major depression in 2004. A 2025 systematic review assessing the benefits and harms of duloxetine in depression found an average change of 1.81 points on the 53-point Hamilton Depression Rating Scale and a small beneficial effect on quality of life, effects below the review's predefined minimal clinically important differences. There was insufficient data to assess suicide or other serious adverse events. All results assessed were at a high risk of bias. A 2012 Cochrane Review did not find greater efficacy of duloxetine compared to SSRIs and newer antidepressants. Additionally, the review found evidence that duloxetine has increased side effects and reduced tolerability compared to other antidepressants. It thus did not recommend duloxetine as a first-line treatment for major depressive disorder, given the (then) high cost of duloxetine compared to inexpensive off-patent antidepressants and lack of increased efficacy. Duloxetine appears less tolerable than some other antidepressants. Generic duloxetine became available in 2013.

=== Generalized anxiety disorder ===
Duloxetine is more effective than placebo in the treatment of generalized anxiety disorder (GAD). A review from the Annals of Internal Medicine lists duloxetine among the first line drug treatments along with citalopram, escitalopram, sertraline, paroxetine, and venlafaxine.

=== Neuropathic pain ===
Duloxetine was approved for the pain associated with diabetic peripheral neuropathy (DPN) by the US Food and Drug Administration (FDA). The response is achieved in the first two weeks on the medication. Duloxetine slightly increased the fasting serum glucose.

The comparative efficacy of duloxetine and established pain-relief medications for diabetic peripheral neuropathy is unclear. A systematic review noted that tricyclic antidepressants (imipramine and amitriptyline), traditional anticonvulsants and opioids have better efficacy than duloxetine. Duloxetine, tricyclic antidepressants, and anticonvulsants have similar tolerability while opioids cause more side effects. Another review in Prescrire International considered the moderate pain relief achieved with duloxetine to be clinically insignificant and the results of the clinical trials unconvincing. The reviewer saw no reason to prescribe duloxetine in practice. The comparative data collected by reviewers in BMC Neurology indicated that amitriptyline, other tricyclic antidepressants, and venlafaxine may be more effective. The authors noted that the evidence in favor of duloxetine is much more solid, however. A Cochrane review concluded that the evidence in support of duloxetine's efficacy in treating painful diabetic neuropathy was adequate and that further trials should focus on comparisons with other medications. A crossover trial found that duloxetine, pregabalin, and amitriptyline offered similar levels of pain relief. Duloxetine also has similar effect on pain relief in diabetic neuropathic pain as gabapentin. Comparing at various doses, the strongest effect on relieving diabetic neuropathic pain is on 120 mg/d dose. Combination treatment of duloxetine and pregabalin offered additional pain relief for people whose pain is not adequately controlled with one medication and was safe.

Duloxetine is also an option for the management of neuropathic pain in multiple sclerosis patients.

=== Fibromyalgia and chronic pain ===
A review of duloxetine found that it reduced pain and fatigue, and improved physical and mental performance compared to placebo.

The US Food and Drug Administration (FDA) approved the drug for the treatment of fibromyalgia in June 2008.

Duloxetine may be useful for chronic pain from osteoarthritis.

In November 2010, the FDA approved duloxetine to treat chronic musculoskeletal pain, including discomfort from osteoarthritis and chronic lower back pain.

=== Stress urinary incontinence ===
Duloxetine failed to receive FDA approval for stress urinary incontinence amid concerns over liver toxicity and suicidal events; it was approved for this use in the United Kingdom, however, where it is recommended as an add-on medication in stress urinary incontinence instead of surgery.

The safety and utility of duloxetine in the treatment of incontinence have been evaluated in a series of meta-analyses and practice guidelines.

- A 2017 meta-analysis found that the harms are at least as great if not greater than the benefits.
- A 2013 meta-analysis concluded that duloxetine decreased incontinence episodes more than placebo with people about 56% more likely than placebo to experience a 50% decrease in episodes. Adverse effects were experienced by 83% of duloxetine-treated subjects and by 45% of placebo-treated subjects.
- A 2012 review and practice guideline published by the European Association of Urology concluded that the clinical trial data provides Grade 1a evidence that duloxetine improves but does not cure urinary incontinence and that it causes a high rate of gastrointestinal side effects (mainly nausea and vomiting) leading to a high rate of treatment discontinuation.
- The National Institute for Clinical and Health Excellence recommends (as of September 2013) that duloxetine not be routinely offered as first-line treatment, and that it only be offered as second-line therapy in women wishing to avoid therapy. The guideline further states that women should be counseled regarding the drug's side effects.

== Contraindications ==
The following contraindications are listed by the manufacturer:

- Hypersensitivity: duloxetine is contraindicated in patients with a known hypersensitivity to duloxetine or any of the inactive ingredients.
- Monoamine oxidase inhibitors (MAOIs): concomitant use in patients taking MAOIs is contraindicated.
- Uncontrolled narrow-angle glaucoma: in clinical trials, Cymbalta use was associated with an increased risk of mydriasis (dilation of the pupil); therefore, its use should be avoided in patients with uncontrolled narrow-angle glaucoma, in which mydriasis can cause sudden worsening.
- Central nervous system (CNS) acting drugs: given the primary CNS effects of duloxetine, it should be used with caution when it is taken in combination with or substituted for other centrally acting drugs, including those with a similar mechanism of action.
- Duloxetine and thioridazine should not be co-administered. (Note: Duloxetine moderately inhibits CYP2D6, decreasing the rate of metabolism and thereby increasing the concentration of thioridazine. The increase raises the patient's risk of lethal ventricular arrhythmias.)

In addition, the FDA has reported on life-threatening drug interactions that may be possible when co-administered with triptans and other drugs acting on serotonin pathways leading to increased risk for serotonin syndrome.

Duloxetine should also be avoided in hepatic impairment such as cirrhosis.

== Adverse effects ==
Nausea, somnolence, insomnia, and dizziness are the main side effects, reported by about 10–20% of patients.

In a trial for major depressive disorder (MDD), the most commonly reported treatment-emergent adverse events among duloxetine-treated patients were nausea (34.7%), dry mouth (22.7%), headache (20.0%) and dizziness (18.7%), and except for headache, these were reported significantly more often than in the placebo group. In a long-term study of fibromyalgia patients receiving duloxetine, frequency and type of adverse effects was similar to that reported in the MDD trial above. Side effects tended to be mild-to-moderate, and tended to decrease in intensity over time.

=== Sexual dysfunction ===
In four clinical trials of duloxetine for the treatment of MDD, sexual dysfunction occurred significantly more frequently in patients treated with duloxetine than those treated with placebo, and this difference occurred only in men. Specifically, common side effects include difficulty becoming aroused, lack of interest in sex, and anorgasmia (trouble achieving orgasm). Loss of or decreased response to sexual stimuli and ejaculatory anhedonia are also reported. Frequency of treatment-emergent sexual dysfunction were similar for duloxetine and SSRIs when compared in a 6-month observational study in depressed patients. Rates of sexual dysfunction in MDD patients treated with duloxetine versus escitalopram did not differ significantly at 4, 8, and 12 weeks of treatment, although the trend favored duloxetine (33.3% of duloxetine patients experienced sexual side effects compared to 43.6% of those receiving escitalopram and 25% of those receiving placebo).

=== Post-SSRI sexual dysfunction ===
Post-SSRI sexual dysfunction (PSSD) is an iatrogenic condition in which sexual side effects persist after discontinuation of serotonin reuptake inhibiting antidepressants, including duloxetine. Characteristic symptoms include genital numbness, pleasureless or weak orgasm, loss of libido, and erectile dysfunction; non-sexual symptoms such as emotional blunting and cognitive impairment may also occur. The condition can arise after even brief exposure to a serotonin reuptake inhibitor and may persist indefinitely; there is currently no established treatment. The DSM-5 noted in 2013 that serotonin reuptake inhibitor–induced sexual dysfunction may persist after the agent is discontinued. A 2023 retrospective cohort study of over 12,000 males estimated the risk of irreversible sexual dysfunction at approximately 0.46% of patients treated with serotonergic antidepressants, including SNRIs, though the actual prevalence remains uncertain and the condition is likely underreported.

In 2019, the European Medicines Agency's Pharmacovigilance Risk Assessment Committee (PRAC) reviewed evidence including data on duloxetine specifically and recommended that product labels for all SSRIs and SNRIs be updated to state that sexual dysfunction may be long-lasting even after treatment is stopped. Health Canada followed with similar label updates in 2021. In 2024, Australia's Therapeutic Goods Administration aligned all SSRI and SNRI product information to reflect this risk, noting that duloxetine was among the products requiring updated warnings about persistent sexual dysfunction.

=== Increased sweating ===
Duloxetine may also cause sweating more than usual (hyperhidrosis).

The exact mechanism behind why duloxetine increases sweating is still not fully understood. However, a possible explanation is in duloxetine's action on the sympathetic nervous system. Sympathetic nerves control thermoregulation and sweating in humans; when increased levels of noradrenaline are present (as seen with SNRIs), this can stimulate sweat gland activity, leading to an increase in perspiration. Norepinephrine release may also cause increased serotonin availability that results from inhibiting reuptake. Such release enhances and further facilitates the activation of post-synaptic α-adrenoceptors by noradrenaline, which can stimulate sweat gland activity, leading to more significant amounts of copious liquid secretion mainly at higher duloxetine dosages above certain thresholds. The amount of sweating experienced may be influenced by the noradrenergic tone, which is determined by the interaction between noradrenergic and serotonergic neurons. Therefore, at higher serum doses or concentrations (above certain thresholds) resulting from therapeutic antidepressant treatment, patients may show more perspiration than at lower doses.

=== Withdrawal ===
During marketing of other SSRIs and SNRIs, there have been spontaneous reports of adverse events occurring upon discontinuation of these drugs, particularly when abrupt, including the following: dysphoric mood, irritability, agitation, dizziness, sensory disturbances (e.g., paresthesias such as brain zap electric shock sensations), anxiety, confusion, headache, lethargy, emotional lability, insomnia, hypomania, tinnitus, and seizures.

When discontinuing treatment with duloxetine, the manufacturer recommends a gradual reduction in the dose, rather than abrupt cessation, whenever possible. If intolerable symptoms occur following a decrease in the dose or upon discontinuation of treatment, then resuming the previously prescribed dose may be considered. Subsequently, the physician may continue decreasing the dose but at a more gradual rate.

In placebo-controlled clinical trials of up to nine weeks' duration of patients with MDD, a systematic evaluation of discontinuation symptoms in patients taking duloxetine following abrupt discontinuation found the following symptoms occurring at a rate greater than or equal to 2% and at a significantly higher rate in duloxetine-treated patients compared to those discontinuing from placebo: dizziness, nausea, headache, paresthesia, vomiting, irritability, and nightmare.

In 2012 The Institute for Safe Medical Practices (ISMP) published a report: "Duloxetine and Serious Withdrawal Symptoms". The report highlights early clinical studies which found "abrupt discontinuation showed that withdrawal effects occurred in 40-50% of patients, that 10% of those were severe and approximately half were not resolved when side effects monitoring had ended after one or two weeks". Withdrawal symptoms listed in 48 case reports (in the first quarter of 2012) included anger, crying, dizziness, and suicidal ideation. The report concluded there was insufficient information and a lack of clear warnings about the effects of discontinuing duloxetine and that in many cases withdrawal symptoms may be "severe, persistent, or both", adding "the prescribing information for physicians and pharmacists does not provide realistic schedules for tapering or a clear picture of the likely incidence of these reactions".

=== Suicidality ===
In the United States, all antidepressants, including duloxetine, carry a black box warning stating that antidepressants may increase the risk of suicide in persons younger than 25. This warning is based on statistical analyses conducted by two independent groups of FDA experts that found a 2-fold increase in the risk of suicidal ideation and behavior in children and adolescents, and a 1.5-fold increase in suicidality in the 18–24 age group. To obtain statistically significant results the FDA combined the results of 295 trials of 11 antidepressants for psychiatric indications. As suicidal ideation and behavior in clinical trials are rare, the results for any drug taken separately usually do not reach statistical significance.

In 2005, the US Food and Drug Administration (FDA) released a public health advisory noting that there had been eleven reports of suicide attempts and three reports of suicidality within the mostly middle-aged women participating in the open-label extension trials of duloxetine for the treatment of stress urinary incontinence (SUI). The FDA described the potential role of confounding social stressors as "unclear". The suicide attempt rate in the SUI study population (based on 9,400 patients) was calculated to be 400 per 100,000 person-years. This rate is more than 2.5 times greater than the suicide attempt rate among middle-aged US women that has been reported in published studies, i.e., 150 to 160 per 100,000 person-years. In addition, one death from suicide was reported in a Cymbalta clinical pharmacology study in a healthy female volunteer without SUI. No increase in suicidality was reported in controlled trials of Cymbalta for depression or diabetic neuropathic pain.

=== Postmarketing reports ===
Reported adverse events that were temporally correlated to duloxetine therapy include rash, reported rarely, and the following adverse events, reported very rarely: alanine aminotransferase increased, alkaline phosphatase increased, anaphylactic reaction, angioneurotic edema, aspartate aminotransferase increased, bilirubin increased, glaucoma, hepatotoxicity, hyponatremia, jaundice, orthostatic hypotension (especially at the initiation of treatment), Stevens–Johnson syndrome, syncope (especially at initiation of treatment), and urticaria.

== Pharmacology ==
=== Mechanism of action ===
Binding profile
Receptor	K_{i} (nM)
SERT	0.7~0.8
NET	7.5
DAT	240
5-HT_{2A}	504
5-HT_{2C}	916
5-HT_{6}	419

Duloxetine inhibits the reuptake of serotonin (5-HT) and norepinephrine (NE) in the central nervous system. Duloxetine increases dopamine (DA) specifically in the prefrontal cortex, where there are few DA reuptake pumps, via the inhibition of NE reuptake pumps (NET), which is believed to mediate the reuptake of DA and NE. Duloxetine has no significant affinity for dopaminergic, cholinergic, histaminergic, opioid, glutamate, and GABA transporters, however, and can therefore be considered to be a selective reuptake inhibitor at the 5-HT and NE transporters. Duloxetine undergoes extensive metabolism, but the major circulating metabolites do not contribute significantly to the pharmacologic activity.

In vitro binding studies using synaptosomal preparations isolated from rat cerebral cortex indicated that duloxetine was approximately 3 fold more potent at inhibiting serotonin reuptake than norepinephrine reuptake.

=== Pharmacokinetics ===
==== Absorption ====
Duloxetine is acid labile, and is formulated with an enteric coating to prevent degradation in the stomach. Duloxetine has good oral bioavailability, averaging 50% after one 60 mg dose. There is an average 2-hour lag until absorption begins with maximum plasma concentrations occurring about 6 hours post-dose. Food or bedtime administration has no significant impact on the C_{max} of duloxetine, but delay time to reach peak concentration by 4 hours. This delay is caused by reduced gastrointestinal motility, and reduce area under curve and half-life by only 11% and 18%, respectively; as such, no dose adjustments or time-of-day restrictions are necessary. Depending on condition being treated, duloxetine is taken once a day or twice a day.

==== Distribution ====
Duloxetine is highly bound (>90%) to proteins in human plasma, binding primarily to albumin and α1-acid glycoprotein. Volume of distribution is about 1640 L.

==== Metabolism ====
Duloxetine undergoes predominately hepatic metabolism via two cytochrome P450 isozymes, CYP2D6 and CYP1A2. Circulating metabolites are pharmacologically inactive. Duloxetine is a moderate CYP2D6 inhibitor.

==== Elimination ====
Duloxetine, administered in a single oral dose of 20 mg or 40 mg has plasma elimination half-life of 10–12 h and its pharmacokinetics are dose proportional over the therapeutic range. Steady-state concentration is usually achieved after 3 days. Only trace amounts (<1%) of unchanged duloxetine are present in the urine and most of the dose (approx. 70%) appears in the urine as metabolites of duloxetine with about 20% excreted in the feces.

Smoking is associated with a decrease in duloxetine concentration.

== Research ==
Major depressive disorder is believed to be due in part to an increase in pro-inflammatory cytokines within the central nervous system. Antidepressants including ones with a similar mechanism of action as duloxetine, i.e., serotonin metabolism inhibition, cause a decrease in proinflammatory cytokine activity and an increase in anti-inflammatory cytokines; this mechanism may apply to duloxetine in its effect on depression but research on cytokines specific to duloxetine therapy is insufficient. Cytokines are immunoregulatory molecules that act in the human immune response. Some cytokines are proinflammatory and contribute to the development of inflammation, while others are anti-inflammatory and help to control the proinflammatory response. Duloxetine can reduce the production of pro-inflammatory cytokines such as interleukin-1 beta (IL-1β), tumor necrosis factor-alpha (TNF-α), and interleukin 6 (IL-6) and may increase the production of anti-inflammatory cytokines such as interleukin 10 (IL-10), however, mechanisms behind these effects are not well explained, there have been mixed findings regarding duloxetine's impact on cytokine production in different contexts, and the results are inconclusive.

Duloxetine is being investigated for its potential to decrease opioid use in the perioperative period because duloxetine administration can help reduce opioid consumption and mitigate the risk of opioid-related side effects and dependence. In total hip arthroplasty (THA) or total knee arthroplasty (TKA), duloxetine is researched to provide pain relief; studies demonstrated that it can reduce pain for several weeks post-surgery without an increased risk of adverse drug events, suggesting that duloxetine could be a valuable component of a multimodal management regimen for patients undergoing THA or TKA. Also, duloxetine can reduce postoperative nausea and vomiting after THA or TKA, which are common side effects of anesthesia and opioids: this additional benefit could improve patient comfort and satisfaction, potentially enhancing recovery outcomes.

== History ==
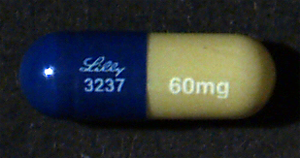
Cymbalta (duloxetine) 60mg

Duloxetine was created by Eli Lilly and Company researchers. David Robertson; David Wong, a co-inventor of fluoxetine; and Joseph Krushinski are listed as inventors on the patent application filed in 1986 and granted in 1990. The first publication on the invention of the racemic form of duloxetine known as LY227942, was made in 1988. The (+)-enantiomer, assigned LY248686, was chosen for further studies, because it inhibited serotonin reuptake in rat synaptosomes to twice the degree of the (–)-enantiomer. This molecule was subsequently named duloxetine.

In 2001, Lilly filed a New Drug Application (NDA) for duloxetine with the US Food and Drug Administration (FDA). In 2003, however, the FDA "recommended this application as not approvable from the manufacturing and control standpoint" because of "significant cGMP (current Good Manufacturing Practice) violations at the finished product manufacturing facility" of Eli Lilly in Indianapolis. Additionally, "potential liver toxicity" and QTc interval prolongation appeared as a concern. The FDA experts concluded that "duloxetine can cause hepatotoxicity in the form of transaminase elevations. It may also be a factor in causing more severe liver injury, but there are no cases in the NDA database that clearly demonstrate this. Use of duloxetine in the presence of ethanol may potentiate the deleterious effect of ethanol on the liver." The FDA also recommended "routine blood pressure monitoring", since there was a dose-dependent increase in elevated blood pressure readings, including at the new highest recommended dose of 120 mg "where 24% of patients had one or more [elevated] blood pressure readings of 140/90 vs. 9% of placebo patients."

After the manufacturing issues were resolved, the liver toxicity warning included in the prescribing information, and the follow-up studies showed that duloxetine does not cause QTc interval prolongation, duloxetine was approved by the FDA for depression and diabetic neuropathy in 2004. In 2007, Health Canada approved duloxetine for the treatment of depression and diabetic peripheral neuropathic pain.

Duloxetine was approved for use of stress urinary incontinence (SUI) in the EU in 2004. In 2005, Lilly withdrew the duloxetine application for stress urinary incontinence (SUI) in the US, stating that discussions with the FDA indicated "the agency is not prepared at this time to grant approval ... based on the data package submitted." A year later, Lilly abandoned the pursuit of this indication in the US market.

The FDA approved duloxetine for the treatment of generalized anxiety disorder in February 2007.

Cymbalta generated sales of nearly US$5 billion in 2012, with $4 billion of that in the US, but its patent protection terminated 1 January 2014. Lilly received a six-month extension beyond 30 June 2013, after testing for the treatment of depression in adolescents, which may produce $1.5 billion in added sales.

The first generic duloxetine was marketed by an Indian pharmaceutical company Dr. Reddy's Laboratories.

On June 15, 2026, the United States Food & Drug Administration announced that New Jersey-based Breckenridge Pharmaceutical, Inc. is recalling 14,729 bottles of duloxetine delayed-release capsules in 30-milligram doses, contained in 1,000-count bottles, after detecting the presence of the carcinogenic substance nitrosamine.

== See also ==
- List of antidepressants
