= Serotonin–norepinephrine reuptake inhibitor =

Class of antidepressant medication

- Drug class
- Duloxetine, an example of an SNRI.

Class identifiers
- Synonyms: Selective serotonin–noradrenaline reuptake inhibitor; SNaRI
- Use: Depression; anxiety; pain; obesity; menopausal symptoms
- Biological target: Serotonin transporter; Norepinephrine transporter

External links
- MeSH: D000068760

Legal status

Serotonin–norepinephrine reuptake inhibitors (SNRIs) are a class of antidepressant medications used to treat major depressive disorder (MDD), anxiety disorders, chronic neuropathic pain, fibromyalgia, and menopausal symptoms. Off-label uses include treatments for attention deficit hyperactivity disorder (ADHD) and obsessive–compulsive disorder (OCD). SNRIs are monoamine reuptake inhibitors; specifically, they inhibit the reuptake of serotonin and norepinephrine. These neurotransmitters are thought to play an important role in mood regulation. SNRIs can be contrasted with the selective serotonin reuptake inhibitors (SSRIs) and norepinephrine reuptake inhibitors (NRIs), which act upon single neurotransmitters. Since norepinephrine pathways play a role in pain modulation, SNRIs are also widely used for chronic pain conditions such as neuropathic pain and fibromyalgia.

The human serotonin transporter (SERT) and norepinephrine transporter (NET) are membrane transport proteins that are responsible for the reuptake of serotonin and norepinephrine from the synaptic cleft back into the presynaptic nerve terminal. Dual inhibition of serotonin and norepinephrine reuptake can offer advantages over other antidepressant drugs by treating a wider range of symptoms. They can be especially useful in concomitant chronic or neuropathic pain.

SNRIs, along with SSRIs and NRIs, are second-generation antidepressants. Since their introduction in the late 1980s, second-generation antidepressants have largely replaced first-generation antidepressants, such as tricyclic antidepressants (TCAs) and monoamine oxidase inhibitors (MAOIs), as the drugs of choice for the treatment of MDD due to their improved tolerability and safety profile.

== Medications ==
As of 2015, there were eight FDA-approved SNRIs in the United States, with venlafaxine being the first drug to be developed in 1993 and levomilnacipran being the latest drug to be developed in 2013. The drugs vary by their other medical uses, chemical structure, adverse effects, and efficacy.

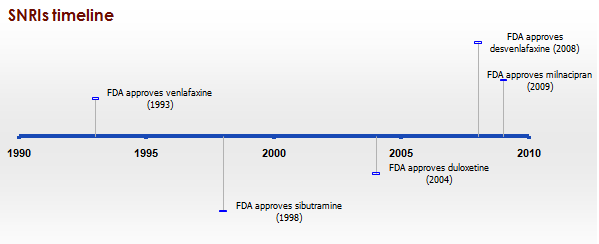
Timeline of approved SNRIs.

Medication	Brand name	FDA Indications	Approval Year	Chemical structure	Notes
Desvenlafaxine	Pristiq Khedezla (ER)	Major depressive disorder	2007		The active metabolite of venlafaxine. It is believed to work in a similar manner, though some evidence suggests lower response rates compared to venlafaxine and duloxetine. It was introduced by Wyeth in May 2008 and was then the third approved SNRI.
Duloxetine	Cymbalta Irenka	Major depressive disorder; Fibromyalgia; Generalized anxiety disorder; Diabetic neuropathy; Chronic musculoskeletal pain (e.g., low back pain); Stress urinary incontinence	2004	Duloxetine	Approved for the treatment of depression and neuropathic pain in August 2004. Duloxetine is contraindicated in patients with heavy alcohol use or chronic liver disease, as duloxetine can increase the levels of certain liver enzymes that can lead to acute hepatitis or other diseases in certain at risk patients. The risk of liver damage appears to be only for patients already at risk, unlike the antidepressant nefazodone, which, though rare, can spontaneously cause liver failure in healthy patients. Duloxetine is also approved for major depressive disorder (MDD), generalized anxiety disorder (GAD), diabetic neuropathy, chronic musculoskeletal pain, including chronic osteoarthritis pain and chronic low back pain. Duloxetine also undergoes hepatic metabolism and has been shown to cause inhibition of the hepatic cytochrome P450 enzyme CYP 2D6. Caution should be taken when taking Duloxetine with other medications that are metabolized by CYP 2D6 as this may precipitate a potential drug-drug interaction.
Levomilnacipran	Fetzima	Major depressive disorder	2013	Levomilnacipran	The levorotating isomer of milnacipran. Under development for the treatment of depression in the United States and Canada, it was approved by the FDA for treatment of MDD in July 2013.
Milnacipran	Ixel; Savella; Impulsor	Fibromyalgia; Major depressive disorder	1996	Milnacipran	Shown to be significantly effective in the treatment of depression and fibromyalgia. The Food and Drug Administration (FDA) approved milnacipran for treatment of fibromyalgia in the United States in January 2009, however it is not approved for depression in that country. Milnacipran has been commercially available in Europe and Asia for several years. It was first introduced in France in 1996.
Sibutramine	Meridia	Obesity	1997		An SNRI, which, instead of being developed for the treatment of depression, was widely marketed as an appetite suppressant for weight loss purposes. Sibutramine was the first drug for the treatment of obesity to be approved in 30 years. It has been associated with increased cardiovascular events and strokes and has been withdrawn from the market in several countries and regions including the United States in 2010.
Tramadol	Ultram	Acute and chronic pain	1977		A dual weak opioid and SNRI. It was approved by the FDA in 1995, though it has been marketed in Germany since 1977. The drug is used to treat acute and chronic pain. It has shown effectiveness in the treatment of fibromyalgia, though it is not specifically approved for this purpose. The drug is also under investigation as an antidepressant and for the treatment of neuropathic pain. It is related in chemical structure to venlafaxine. Due to being an opioid, there is risk of abuse and addiction, but it does have less abuse potential, respiratory depression, and constipation compared to other opioids (hydrocodone, oxycodone, etc.).
Venlafaxine	Effexor	Major depressive disorder; Generalized anxiety disorder; Social anxiety disorder; Panic disorder; Chronic pain syndromes; Vasomotor symptoms of menopause (hot flashes)	1994		The first and most commonly used SNRI. It was introduced by Wyeth in 1994. The reuptake effects of venlafaxine are dose-dependent. At low doses (<150 mg/day), it acts primarily on serotonergic transmission. At moderate doses (>150 mg/day), it acts on serotonergic and noradrenergic systems, whereas at high doses (>300 mg/day), it also affects dopaminergic neurotransmission. At small doses, venlafaxine has also been shown to be effective in treating vasomotor symptoms (hot flashes and night sweats) of menopause.

== History ==
In 1952, iproniazid, an antimycobacterial agent, was discovered to have psychoactive properties while researched as a possible treatment for tuberculosis. Researchers noted that patients given iproniazid became cheerful, more optimistic, and more physically active. Soon after its development, iproniazid and related substances were shown to slow enzymatic breakdown of serotonin, dopamine, and norepinephrine via inhibition of the enzyme monoamine oxidase. For this reason, this class of drugs became known as monoamine oxidase inhibitors, or MAOIs. During this time development of distinctively different antidepressant agents was also researched. Imipramine became the first clinically useful tricyclic antidepressant (TCA). Imipramine was found to affect numerous neurotransmitter systems and to block the reuptake of norepinephrine and serotonin from the synapse, therefore increasing the levels of these neurotransmitters. Use of MAOIs and TCAs gave major advances in treatment of depression but their use was limited by unpleasant side effects and significant safety and toxicity issues.

Throughout the 1960s and 1970s, the catecholamine hypothesis of emotion and its relation to depression was of wide interest and that the decreased levels of certain neurotransmitters, such as norepinephrine, serotonin, and dopamine might play a role in the pathogenesis of depression. This led to the development of fluoxetine, the first SSRI. The improved safety and tolerability profile of the SSRIs in patients with MDD, compared with TCAs and MAOIs, represented yet another important advance in the treatment of depression.

Since the late 1980s, SSRIs have dominated the antidepressant drug market. Today, there is increased interest in antidepressant drugs with broader mechanisms of action that may offer improvements in efficacy and tolerability. In 1993, a new drug was introduced to the US market called venlafaxine, a serotonin–norepinephrine reuptake inhibitor. Venlafaxine was the first compound described in a new class of antidepressant substances called phenylethylamines. These substances are unrelated to TCA and other SSRIs. Venlafaxine blocks the neuronal reuptake of serotonin, norepinephrine, and, to a lesser extent, dopamine in the central nervous system. In contrast with several other antidepressant drugs, venlafaxine can induce a rapid onset of action mainly due to a subsequent norepinephrine reuptake inhibition. See timeline in figure 1.

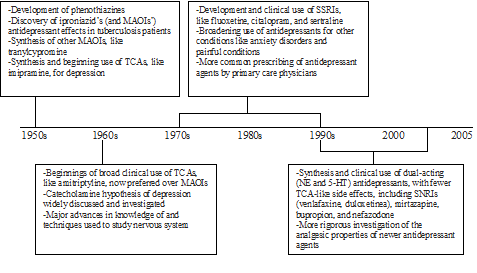
Timeline of development of antidepressant agents.

== Mechanism of action ==
Inhibiting the reuptake transport protein results in increased concentrations of serotonin and norepinephrine in the synaptic clefts, leading to improvement of depression symptoms. This diagram shows the presynaptic neuron, synaptic cleft and the release and reuptake of serotonin and norepinephrine which are the transporters targeted by SNRIs.

Monoamines are connected to the pathophysiology of depression. Symptoms may occur because concentrations of neurotransmitters, such as norepinephrine and serotonin, are insufficient, leading to downstream changes. Medications for depression affect the transmission of serotonin, norepinephrine, and dopamine. Older and less selective antidepressants like TCAs and MAOIs inhibit the reuptake or metabolism of norepinephrine and serotonin in the brain, which results in higher concentrations of neurotransmitters. Antidepressants that have dual mechanisms of action inhibit the reuptake of both serotonin and norepinephrine and, in some cases, inhibit with weak effect the reuptake of dopamine. Antidepressants affect variable neuronal receptors such as muscarinic cholinergic, α_{1}- and α_{2}-adrenergic, H_{1}-histaminergic, and sodium channels in the cardiac muscle, leading to decreased cardiac conduction and cardiotoxicity associated particularly with TCAs, and to a lesser extent with SSRIs. Selectivity of antidepressant agents are based on the neurotransmitters that are thought to influence symptoms of depression. Drugs that selectively block the reuptake of serotonin and norepinephrine effectively treat depression and are better tolerated than TCAs. TCAs have comprehensive effects on various neurotransmitters receptors, which leads to lack of tolerability and increased risk of toxicity. SNRIs primarily work by binding to and thus inhibiting the serotonin transporter (SERT) and norepinephrine transporter (NET). Inhibition of these transporters leads to an increase in serotonergic and noradrenergic signalling at postsynaptic receptors. Each drug blocks SERT versus NET differently, which is why there are differences in side effect profiles and therapeutic effects.

=== Tricyclic antidepressants ===
TCAs were the first medications that had dual mechanism of action. The mechanism of action of tricyclic secondary amine antidepressants is only partly understood. TCAs have dual inhibition effects on norepinephrine reuptake transporters and serotonin reuptake transporters. Increased norepinephrine and serotonin concentrations are obtained by inhibiting both of these transporter proteins. TCAs have substantially more affinity for norepinephrine reuptake proteins than the SSRIs. This is because of a formation of secondary amine TCA metabolites.

In addition, the TCAs interact with adrenergic receptors. This interaction seems to be critical for increased availability of norepinephrine in or near the synaptic clefts. Actions of imipramine-like tricyclic antidepressants have complex, secondary adaptions to their initial and sustained actions as inhibitors of norepinephrine transport and variable blockade of serotonin transport.

Norepinephrine interacts with postsynaptic α and β adrenergic receptor subtypes and presynaptic α_{2} autoreceptors. The α_{2} receptors include presynaptic autoreceptors which limit the neurophysiological activity of noradrenergic neurons in the central nervous system. Formation of norepinephrine is reduced by autoreceptors through the rate-limiting enzyme tyrosine hydroxylase, an effect mediated by decreased cyclic AMP-mediated phosphorylation-activation of the enzyme. α_{2} receptors also cause decreased intracellular cyclic AMP expression which results in smooth muscle relaxation or decreased secretion.

TCAs activate a negative feedback mechanism through their effects on presynaptic receptors. One probable explanation for the effects on decreased neurotransmitter release is that, as the receptors activate, inhibition of neurotransmitter release occurs (including suppression of voltage-gated Ca^{2+} currents and activation of G protein-coupled receptor-operated K^{+} currents). Repeated exposure of agents with this type of mechanism leads to inhibition of neurotransmitter release, but repeated administration of TCAs finally leads to decreased responses by α_{2} receptors. The desensitization of these responses may be due to increased exposure to endogenous norepinephrine or from the prolonged occupation of the norepinephrine transport mechanisms (via an allosteric effect). The adaptation allows the presynaptic synthesis and secretion of norepinephrine to return to, or even exceed, normal levels of norepinephrine in the synaptic clefts. Overall, inhibition of norepinephrine reuptake induced by TCAs leads to decreased rates of neuron firing (mediated through α_{2} autoreceptors), metabolic activity, and release of neurotransmitters.

TCAs do not block dopamine transport directly but might facilitate dopaminergic effects indirectly by inhibiting dopamine transport into noradrenergic terminals of the cerebral cortex. Because they affect so many different receptors, TCAs have adverse effects, poor tolerability, and an increased risk of toxicity.

=== Selective serotonin reuptake inhibitors ===
Selective serotonin reuptake inhibitors (SSRIs) selectively inhibit the reuptake of serotonin and are a widely used group of antidepressants. With increased receptor selectivity compared to TCAs, undesired effects such as poor tolerability are avoided. Serotonin is synthesized from an amino acid called L-tryptophan. Active transport system regulates the uptake of tryptophan across the blood–brain barrier. Serotonergic pathways are classified into two main ways in the brain: the ascending projections from the medial and dorsal raphe and the descending projections from the caudal raphe into the spinal cord.

=== Selective norepinephrine reuptake inhibitors ===
Noradrenergic neurons are located in two major regions in the brain, the locus coeruleus and lateral tegmental. With administration of SNRIs, neuronal activity in the locus coeruleus is induced because of increased concentration of norepinephrine in the synaptic cleft. This results in activation of α_{2} adrenergic receptors, as discussed previously.

Assays have shown that SNRIs have insignificant penchant for mACh, α_{1} and α_{2} adrenergic, or H_{1} receptors.

=== Dual serotonin and norepinephrine reuptake inhibitors ===
Agents with dual serotonin and norepinephrine reuptake inhibition (SNRIs) are sometimes called non-tricyclic serotonin and norepinephrine reuptake inhibitors. Clinical studies suggest that compounds that increase the concentration in the synaptic cleft of both norepinephrine and serotonin are more successful than single acting agents in the treatment of depression, but the data is not conclusive whether SNRIs are a more effective treatment option over SSRIs for depression.

The non-tricyclic SNRIs have several important differences that are based on pharmacokinetics, metabolism to active metabolites, inhibition of CYP isoforms, effect of drug-drug interactions, and the half-life of the nontricyclic SNRIs.

Combination of mechanisms of action in a single active agent is an important development in psychopharmacology.

=== Neuroplasticity ===
SNRIs do not work immediately; their mood related therapeutic effect builds up over several weeks. Long-term use of SNRIs can change the brain's signaling pathway beyond raising serotonin and norepinephrine. Some studies have shown an increase in BDNF (growth factor) with continued SNRI treatment. BDNF helps the brain adjust and form better connections through synapse strengthening and remodeling. This is also part of the reason why it takes some time for antidepressants to show full benefits. Another aspect of this neuroplastic effect is the adaptation of the pain pathway as well, which may help explain why SNRIs can help with chronic pain.

== Structure activity relationship ==
=== Aryloxypropanamine scaffold ===
Several reuptake inhibitors contain an aryloxypropanamine scaffold. This structural motif has potential for high affinity binding to biogenic amine transports. Drugs containing an aryloxypropanamine scaffold have selectivity profile for norepinephrine and serotonin transporters that depends on the substitution pattern of the aryloxy ring. Selective NRIs contain a substituent in 2' position of the aryloxy ring but SSRIs contain a substituent in 4' position of the aryloxy ring. Atomoxetine, nisoxetine and reboxetine all have a substitution group in the 2' position and are selective NRIs while compounds that have a substitution group in the 4' position (like fluoxetine and paroxetine) are SSRIs. Duloxetine contains a phenyl group fused at the 2' and 3' positions, therefore it has dual selective norepinephrine and serotonin reuptake inhibitory effects and has similar potencies for both transporters. The nature of the aromatic substituent also has a significant influence on the activity and selectivity of the compounds as inhibitors of the serotonin or the norepinephrine transporters.

Aryloxypropanamine scaffold and agents containing it.

=== Cycloalkanol ethylamine scaffold ===
Venlafaxine and desvenlafaxine contain a cycloalkanol ethylamine scaffold. Increasing the electron-withdrawing nature of the aromatic ring provides a more potent inhibitory effect of norepinephrine uptake and improves the selectivity for norepinephrine over the serotonin transporter. Effects of chloro, methoxy and trifluoromethyl substituents in the aromatic ring of cycloalkanol ethylamine scaffold were tested. The results showed that the strongest electron-withdrawing m-trifluoromethyl analogue exhibited the most potent inhibitory effect of norepinephrine and the most selectivity over serotonin uptake. WY-46824, a piperazine-containing derivative, has shown norepinephrine and dopamine reuptake inhibition. Further synthesis and testing identified WAY-256805, a potent norepinephrine reuptake inhibitor that exhibited excellent selectivity and was efficacious in animal models of depression, pain, and thermoregulatory dysfunction.

Cycloalkanol ethylamine scaffold and agents containing it.

=== Milnacipran ===
Structure of milnacipran.

Milnacipran is structurally different from other SNRIs. The structure activity relationship of milnacipran derivatives at the transporter level is still largely unclear and is based on in vivo efficacy that was reported in 1987. N-methylation of milnacipran in substituent group R^{4} and R^{5} reduces the norepinephrine and serotonin activity. Researches on different secondary amides in substitution groups R^{6} and R^{7} showed that π electrons play an important role in the interaction between transporters and ligands. A phenyl group in substituent R^{6} showed effect on norepinephrine transporters. Substituent groups in R^{6} and R^{7} with allylic double bond showed significant improved effect on both norepinephrine and serotonin transporters. Studies show that introducing a 2-methyl group in substituent R^{3}, the potency at norepinephrine and serotonin transporters are almost abolished. Methyl groups in substituent groups R^{1} and R^{2} also abolish the potency at norepinephrine and serotonin transporters. Researchers found that replacing one of the ethyl groups of milnacipran with an allyl moiety increases the norepinephrine potency. The pharmacophore of milnacipran derivatives is still largely unclear.

The conformation of milnacipran is an important part of its pharmacophore. Changing its stereochemistry affects the norepinephrine and serotonin concentration. Milnacipran is marketed as a racemic mixture. Effects of milnacipran reside in the (1S,2R)-isomer and substitution of the phenyl group in the (1S,2R)-isomer has negative impact on norepinephrine concentration. Milnacipran has low molecular weight and low lipophilicity. Because of these properties, milnacipran exhibits almost ideal pharmacokinetics in humans such as high bioavailability, low inter-subject variability, limited liver enzyme interaction, moderate tissue distribution and a reasonably long elimination half-life. Milnacipran's lack of drug-drug interactions via cytochrome P450 enzymes is thought to be an attractive feature because many of the central nervous system drugs are highly lipophilic and are mainly eliminated by liver enzymes.

=== Future development of structure activity relationship ===
The application of an aryloxypropanamine scaffold has generated a number of potent MAOIs. Before the development of duloxetine, the exploration of aryloxypropanamine structure activity relationships resulted in the identification of fluoxetine and atomoxetine. The same motif can be found in reboxetine where it is constrained in a morpholine ring system. Some studies have been made where the oxygen in reboxetine is replaced by sulfur to give arylthiomethyl morpholine. Some of the arylthiomethyl morpholine derivatives maintain potent levels of serotonin and norepinephrine reuptake inhibition. Dual serotonin and norepinephrine reuptake inhibition resides in different enantiomers for arylthiomethyl morpholine scaffold. Possible drug candidates with dual serotonin and norepinephrine reuptake inhibitory activity have also been derived from piperazine, 3-amino-pyrrolidine and benzylamine templates.

== Clinical trials ==
=== Depression ===
Several studies have shown that antidepressant drugs that have combined serotonergic and noradrenergic activity are generally more effective than SSRIs, which act upon serotonin reuptake by themselves. Serotonergic-noradrenergic antidepressant drugs may have a modest efficacy advantage compared to SSRIs in treating major depressive disorder (MDD), but are slightly less well tolerated. Further research is needed to examine the possible differences in efficacy in specific MDD sub-populations or for specific MDD symptoms, between these classes of antidepressant drugs.

=== Analgesic ===
Data from clinical trials have indicated that SNRIs might have pain-relieving properties. Although the perception and transmission of pain stimuli in the central nervous system have not been fully elucidated, extensive data support the roles of serotonin and norepinephrine in pain modulation. Findings from clinical trials in humans have shown that these antidepressants can help to reduce pain and functional impairment in central and neuropathic pain conditions. This property of SNRIs might be used to reduce doses of other pain relieving medication and lower the frequency of safety, limited efficacy, and tolerability issues.

Clinical research data has shown that in patients with GAD, duloxetine is significantly more effective than placebo in reducing pain-related symptoms of GAD, after short-term and long-term treatment. However, findings suggested that such symptoms of physical pain recur in relapse situations, which indicate a need for ongoing treatment in patients with GAD and concurrent painful physical symptoms.

== Indications ==
SNRIs have been tested for the treatment of the following conditions:

- Major depressive disorder (MDD)
- Post-traumatic stress disorder (PTSD)
- Generalized anxiety disorder (GAD)
- Social anxiety disorder (SAD)
- Obsessive–compulsive disorder (OCD)
- Panic disorder
- Neuropathic pain
- Fibromyalgia
- Chronic musculoskeletal pain

Neuropathic pain involves the descending noradrenergic pathways, which help regulate pain signals. By increasing norepinephrine in these pathways, SNRIs can help reduce pain transmission independently of its antidepressant effects.

== Pharmacology ==
=== Route of administration ===
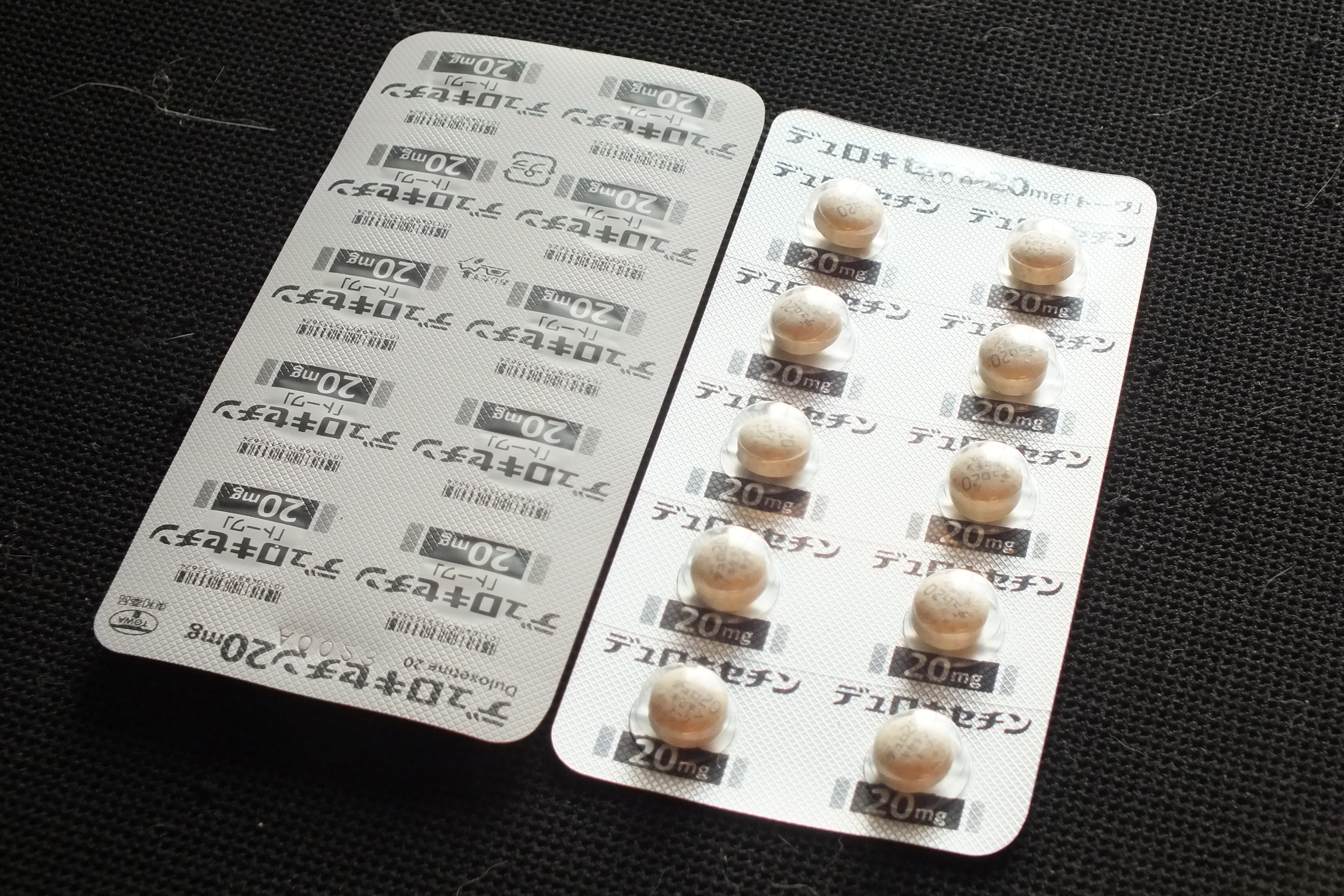
Duloxetine, oral administration

SNRIs are delivered orally, usually in the form of capsules or tablets. It is recommended to take SNRIs in the morning with breakfast, which does not affect drug levels, but may help with certain side effects. Norepinephrine has activating effects in the body and therefore can cause insomnia in some patients if taken at bedtime. SNRIs can also cause nausea, which is usually mild and goes away within a few weeks of treatment, but taking the medication with food can help alleviate this.

=== Mode of action ===
The condition for which SNRIs are mostly indicated, major depressive disorder, was thought to be mainly caused by decreased levels of serotonin and norepinephrine in the synaptic cleft, causing erratic signaling. Based on the monoamine hypothesis of depression, which asserts that decreased concentrations of monoamine neurotransmitters leads to depressive symptoms, the following relations were determined: "Norepinephrine may be related to alertness and energy as well as anxiety, attention, and interest in life; [lack of] serotonin to anxiety, obsessions, and compulsions; and dopamine to attention, motivation, pleasure, and reward, as well as interest in life." SNRIs work by inhibiting the reuptake of the neurotransmitters serotonin and norepinephrine. This results in increased extracellular concentrations of serotonin and norepinephrine and, consequently, an increase in neurotransmission. Most SNRIs including venlafaxine, desvenlafaxine, and duloxetine, are several fold more selective for serotonin over norepinephrine, while milnacipran is three times more selective for norepinephrine than serotonin. Elevation of norepinephrine levels is thought to be necessary for an antidepressant to be effective against neuropathic pain, a property shared with the older tricyclic antidepressants (TCAs), but not with the SSRIs.

Recent studies have shown that depression may be linked to increased inflammatory response, thus attempts at finding an additional mechanism for SNRIs have been made. Studies have shown that SNRIs as well as SSRIs have significant anti-inflammatory action on microglia in addition to their effect on serotonin and norepinephrine levels. As such, it is possible that an additional mechanism of these drugs that acts in combination with the previously understood mechanism exist. The implication behind these findings suggests use of SNRIs as potential anti-inflammatories following brain injury or any other disease where swelling of the brain is an issue. However, regardless of the mechanism, the efficacy of these drugs in treating the diseases for which they have been indicated has been proven, both clinically and in practice.

=== Pharmacodynamics ===
Most SNRIs function alongside primary metabolites and secondary metabolites in order to inhibit reuptake of serotonin, norepinepherine, and marginal amounts of dopamine. For example, venlafaxine works alongside its primary metabolite O-desmethylvenlafaxine to strongly inhibit serotonin and norepinephrine reuptake in the brain. The evidence also suggests that dopamine and norepinephrine behave in a co-transportational manner, due to the inactivation of dopamine by norepinephrine reuptake in the frontal cortex, an area of the brain largely lacking in dopamine transporters. This effect of SNRIs results in increased dopamine neurotransmission, in addition to the increases in serotonin and norepinephrine activity. Furthermore, because SNRIs are extremely selective, they have no measurable effects on other, unintended receptors, in contrast to monoamine oxidase inhibition. Pharmaceutical tests have determined that use of both SNRIs or SSRIs can generate significant anti-inflammatory action on microglia, as well.

==== Activity profiles ====
SNRIs at the human SERT and NET
Compound	SERT		NET		~Ratio (5-HT : NE)
Compound	K_{i}	IC_{50}	K_{i}	IC_{50}	~Ratio (5-HT : NE)
Venlafaxine	7.8	145	1920	1420	~1:2
Desvenlafaxine	40.2	47.3	558.4	531.3	11.2:1
Duloxetine	0.07	3.7	1.17	20	5.4:1
Atomoxetine	87		5.4		0.06:1 (= 1:16)
Milnacipran	8.44	151	22	68	2:1
Levomilnacipran	11.2	19.0	92.2	10.5	0.55:1 (= 1:1.8)
All of the K_{i} and IC_{50} values are nM. The 5-HT/NE ratio is based on IC_{50} values for the SERT and NET.

=== Pharmacokinetics ===
The half-life of venlafaxine is about 5 hours, and with once-daily dosing, steady-state concentration is achieved after about 3 days, though its active metabolite desvenlafaxine lasts longer. The half-life of desvenlafaxine is about 11 hours, and steady-state concentrations are achieved after 4 to 5 days. The half-life of duloxetine is about 12 hours (range: 8–17 hours), and steady-state is achieved after about 3 days. Milnacipran has a half-life of about 6 to 8 hours, and steady-state levels are reached within 36 to 48 hours.

== Contraindications ==
SNRIs are contraindicated in patients taking MAOIs within the last two weeks due to the increased risk of serotonin syndrome, which can be life-threatening. Other drugs and substances that should be avoided due to increased risk of serotonin syndrome when combined with an SNRI include: other anti-depressants, anti-convulsants, analgesics, antiemetic agents, anti-migraine medications, methylene blue, linezolid, Lithium, St. John's wort, ecstasy, and LSD. Signs and symptoms of serotonin syndrome include hyperthermia, rigidity, myoclonus, autonomic instability with fluctuating vital signs, and mental status changes that include extreme agitation progressing to delirium and coma.

Due to the effects of increased norepinephrine levels and, therefore, higher noradrenergic activity, pre-existing hypertension should be controlled before treatment with SNRIs and blood pressure periodically monitored throughout treatment. Duloxetine has also been associated with cases of liver failure and should not be prescribed to patients with chronic alcohol use or liver disease. Studies have found that duloxetine can increase liver function tests three times above their upper normal limit. Patients with coronary artery disease should be cautious with the use of SNRIs. Furthermore, due to the actions of some SNRIs on obesity, patients with eating disorders such as anorexia nervosa or bulimia should not be prescribed SNRIs. Duloxetine and milnacipran are also contraindicated in patients with uncontrolled narrow-angle glaucoma, as they have been shown to increase incidence of mydriasis.

SNRIs should not be used to treat depressive episodes in bipolar I disorder and should only be used to treat depression in bipolar II disorder with caution and accompanied by mood stabilizers to avoid hypomania.

== Side effects ==
Since SNRIs and SSRIs act in similar ways to elevate serotonin levels, they share many side effects, though to varying degrees. Some common side effects include nausea, dry mouth, dizziness, sweating, increased blood pressure, loss of appetite, headache, increase in suicidal thoughts, and sexual dysfunction. Elevation of norepinephrine levels can sometimes cause anxiety, mildly elevated pulse, and elevated blood pressure. However, norepinephrine-selective antidepressants, such as reboxetine and desipramine, have successfully treated anxiety disorders. People at risk for hypertension and heart disease should monitor their blood pressure.

=== Sexual Dysfunction ===
SNRIs, similarly to SSRIs, can cause several types of sexual dysfunction, such as erectile dysfunction, decreased libido, sexual anhedonia, and anorgasmia. The two common sexual side effects are diminished interest in sex (libido) and difficulty reaching climax (anorgasmia), which are usually somewhat milder with SNRIs compared to SSRIs. To manage sexual dysfunction, studies have shown that switching to or augmenting with bupropion or adding a PDE5 Inhibitor have decreased symptoms of sexual dysfunction. Studies have shown that PDE5 Inhibitors, such as sildenafil (Viagra), tadalafil (Cialis), vardenafil (Levitra), and avanafil (Stendra), have sometimes been helpful to decrease the sexual dysfunction, including erectile dysfunction, although they have been shown to be more effective in men than women.

=== Serotonin Syndrome ===
A serious, but rare, side effect of SNRIs is serotonin syndrome, which is caused by an excess of serotonin in the body. Serotonin syndrome can be caused by taking multiple serotonergic drugs, such as SSRIs or SNRIs. Other drugs that contribute to serotonin syndrome include MAO inhibitors, linezolid, tedizolid, methylene blue, procarbazine, amphetamines, clomipramine, and more. Early symptoms of serotonin syndrome may include nausea, vomiting, diarrhea, sweating, agitation, confusion, muscle rigidity, dilated pupils, hyperthermia, rigidity, and goose bumps. More severe symptoms include fever, seizures, irregular heartbeat, delirium, and coma. If signs or symptoms arise, discontinue treatment with serotonergic agents immediately. It is recommended to washout 4 to 5 half-lives of the serotonergic agent before using an MAO inhibitor.

=== Bleeding ===
Some studies suggest there are risks of upper gastrointestinal bleeding, especially venlafaxine, due to impairment of platelet aggregation and depletion of platelet serotonin levels. Similarly to SSRIs, SNRIs may interact with anticoagulants, like warfarin. There is more evidence of SSRIs having higher risk of bleeding than SNRIs. Studies have suggested caution when using SNRIs or SSRIs with high doses of nonsteroidal anti-inflammatory drugs (NSAIDs), such as ibuprofen or naproxen due to an increased risk of upper GI bleeding.

=== Visual problems ===
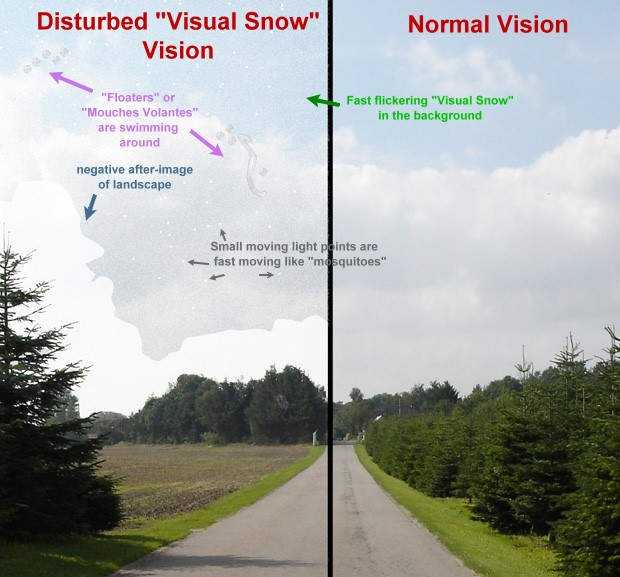
Image depicting the vision of someone with visual snow syndrome or hallucinogen persisting perception disorder.

Similarly to other antidepressants, SNRI medications have been found to cause visual snow syndrome, a condition characterized by visual static, palinopsia (negative after image), nyctalopia (poor vision at night), and photophobia (brighter presentation of lights or highlighted colors). Evidence shows that 8.9% of those taking SNRIs experienced visual snow, 10.5% experienced palinopsia, 15.3% experienced photophobia, and 17.7% experienced nyctolopia as the result of SNRI prescription intake. Amitriptyline, and citalopram have also been reported to worsen or cause symptoms of VSS.

== Precautions ==
=== Starting an SNRI regimen ===
Due to the extreme changes in noradrenergic activity produced from norepinephrine and serotonin reuptake inhibition, patients that are just starting an SNRI regimen are usually given lower doses than their expected final dosing to allow the body to acclimate to the drug's effects. As the patient continues along at low doses without any side-effects, the dose is incrementally increased until the patient sees improvement in symptoms without detrimental side-effects.

=== Discontinuation syndrome ===
As with SSRIs, the abrupt discontinuation of an SNRI usually leads to withdrawal, or "discontinuation syndrome", which could include states of anxiety and other symptoms. Therefore, it is recommended that users seeking to discontinue an SNRI slowly taper the dose under the supervision of a professional. Discontinuation syndrome has been reported to be markedly worse for venlafaxine when compared to other SNRIs. As such, as tramadol is related to venlafaxine, the same conditions apply. This is likely due to venlafaxine's relatively short half-life and therefore rapid clearance upon discontinuation. In some cases, switching from venlafaxine to fluoxetine, a long-acting SSRI, and then tapering off fluoxetine, may be recommended to reduce discontinuation symptoms. Signs and symptoms of withdrawal from abrupt cessation of an SNRI include dizziness, anxiety, insomnia, nausea, sweating, and flu-like symptoms, such as lethargy and malaise.

== Overdose ==
=== Causes ===
Overdosing on SNRIs can be caused by either drug combinations or excessive amounts of the drug itself. Venlafaxine is marginally more toxic in overdose than duloxetine or the SSRIs.

=== Symptoms ===
Symptoms of SNRI overdose, whether it be a mixed drug interaction or the drug alone, vary in intensity and incidence based on the amount of medicine taken and the individuals sensitivity to SNRI treatment. Possible symptoms may include:

- Somnolence
- Coma
- Serotonin syndrome
- Seizures
- Syncope
- Tachycardia
- Hypotension
- Hypertension
- Hyperthermia
- Vomiting

=== Management ===
Overdose is usually treated symptomatically, especially in the case of serotonin syndrome, which requires treatment with cyproheptadine and temperature control based on the progression of the serotonin toxicity. Patients are often monitored for vitals and airways cleared to ensure that they are receiving adequate levels of oxygen. Another option is to use activated carbon in the GI tract in order to absorb excess neurotransmitter.

== Comparison to SSRIs ==
As SNRIs were developed more recently than SSRIs, there are relatively few of them. However, the SNRIs are among the most widely used antidepressants today. In 2009, Cymbalta and Effexor were the 11th- and 12th-most-prescribed branded drugs in the United States, respectively. This translates to the 2nd- and 3rd-most-common antidepressants, behind Lexapro (escitalopram), an SSRI. In some studies, SNRIs demonstrated slightly higher antidepressant efficacy than the SSRIs (response rates 63.6% versus 59.3%). However, in one study escitalopram had a superior efficacy profile to venlafaxine.

SSRIs do not significantly increase norepinephrine, which is where SNRIs may be used for a greater variety of conditions involving norepinephrine, such as chronic pain disorders. Some additional side effects noted with SNRIs can include increased heart rate and blood pressure. Overall, most patients are able to tolerate both similarly, and their choice depends more on their symptoms, medical history, and previous response to antidepressants.

== Special populations ==
=== Pregnancy ===
No antidepressants are FDA approved during pregnancy. Use of antidepressants during pregnancy may result in fetus abnormalities affecting functional development of the brain and behavior. Studies have shown correlations between pregnant women treated with SNRIs and risk of hypertensive disorders, preeclampsia, miscarriage, seizures in children, and many other adverse affects.

=== Pediatrics ===
SSRIs and SNRIs have been shown to be effective in treating major depressive disorder and anxiety in pediatric populations. However, differences in metabolism, renal function, and total percentage of body water and body fat can influence the pharmacokinetics of medications in youths as compared to adults. Additionally, there is a risk of increased suicidality in pediatric populations for treatment of major depressive disorder, especially with venlafaxine. Fluoxetine and Escitalopram are the only antidepressants that are approved for child/adolescent major depressive disorder. A literature review by Castagna, et al. from 2023 shows indications of efficacy treating pediatric generalized anxiety disorder. Currently, Duloxetine, an SNRI, is the only FDA-approved medication for pediatric GAD, despite the fact that SSRIs are typically first-line treatment. It is suggested that these medications be combined with psychotherapy to maximize effectiveness.

=== Geriatrics ===
Most antidepressants, including SNRIs, are safe and effective in the geriatric population. The geriatric population is at greater risk for adverse effects relating to drug interaction as they are more likely to experience polypharmacy. Decisions are often based on co-morbid conditions, drug interactions, and patient tolerance. Due to differences in body composition and metabolism, starting doses are often half that of the recommended dose for younger adults. Studies show that these factors also put the geriatric population at increased risk of adverse effects when treated with SNRIs but not with SSRIs.

== Research ==
A systematic review that looked at the efficacy of antidepressants for pain relief concludes that only 11 of 42 comparisons showed evidence of efficacy. Seven of the eleven comparisons belong to the SNRI drug class.

== See also ==
- List of antidepressants
- Selective serotonin reuptake inhibitor
