= BMC Neurology =

Academic journal published by BioMed Central

- Discipline: Neurology
- Language: English

Publication details
- History: 2001–present
- Publisher: BioMed Central
- Frequency: Continuous
- Open access: Yes
- License: Creative Commons Licenses
- Impact factor: 2.5 (2024)

Standard abbreviations
- ISO 4: BMC Neurol.

Indexing
- ISSN: 1471-2377

Links
- Journal homepage

BMC Neurology is a peer-reviewed open-access scientific journal covering all aspects of neurology, including neurodegenerative diseases, stroke, epilepsy, neuromuscular disorders, and headache research. It is part of the BMC series of journals published by BioMed Central.

== Abstracting and indexing ==
The journal is abstracted and indexed, for example, in:

- DOAJ
- EBSCO databases
- ProQuest
- Scopus
- Science Citation Index Expanded

According to the Journal Citation Reports, the journal had an impact factor of 2.5 in 2024.
