= Desvenlafaxine =

SNRI antidepressant

Clinical data
- Pronunciation: /dɛsˌvɛnləˈfæksiːn/ des-ven-lə-FAK-seen
- Trade names: Pristiq, Desfax, Ellefore, others
- Other names: O-desmethylvenlafaxine, WY-45233
- AHFS/Drugs.com: Monograph
- MedlinePlus: a608022
- License data: US DailyMed: Desvenlafaxine
- Pregnancy category: AU: B2
- Routes of administration: By mouth
- Drug class: Serotonin–norepinephrine reuptake inhibitor (SNRI)
- ATC code: N06AX23 (WHO)

Legal status
- Legal status: AU: S4 (Prescription only); BR: Class C1 (Other controlled substances); CA: ℞-only; US: ℞-only

Pharmacokinetic data
- Bioavailability: 80%
- Protein binding: Low (30%)
- Metabolism: CYP2C19, CYP3A4, (CYP2D6 is not involved)
- Elimination half-life: 11 hours
- Excretion: 45% excreted unchanged in urine

Identifiers
- IUPAC name: (RS)-4-[2-dimethylamino-1-(1-hydroxycyclohexyl) ethyl]phenol
- CAS Number: 93413-62-8
- PubChem CID: 125017
- IUPHAR/BPS: 7158
- DrugBank: DB06700
- ChemSpider: 111300
- UNII: NG99554ANW
- KEGG: D07793
- ChEBI: CHEBI:83527
- ChEMBL: ChEMBL1118
- CompTox Dashboard (EPA): DTXSID40869118
- ECHA InfoCard: 100.149.615

Chemical and physical data
- Formula: C_{16}H_{25}NO_{2}
- Molar mass: 263.381 g·mol^{−1}
- 3D model (JSmol): Interactive image
- SMILES: OC2(C(c1ccc(O)cc1)CN(C)C)CCCCC2
- InChI: InChI=1S/C16H25NO2/c1-17(2)12-15(13-6-8-14(18)9-7-13)16(19)10-4-3-5-11-16/h6-9,15,18-19H,3-5,10-12H2,1-2H3; Key:KYYIDSXMWOZKMP-UHFFFAOYSA-N

Desvenlafaxine, sold under the brand name Pristiq among others, is a medication used to treat major depressive disorder. It is an antidepressant of the serotonin–norepinephrine reuptake inhibitor (SNRI) class and is taken by mouth. It is recommended that the need for further treatment be occasionally reassessed. Studies have shown similar effectiveness compared to its parent compound venlafaxine.

Common side effects include dizziness, trouble sleeping, increased sweating, constipation, sleepiness, anxiety, and sexual problems. In some patients, sexual dysfunction may persist even after the drug is discontinued, a condition known as post-SSRI sexual dysfunction; regulatory agencies including the European Medicines Agency and Health Canada have recommended that desvenlafaxine's product labeling warn of this risk. Serious side effects may include suicide in those under the age of 25, serotonin syndrome, bleeding, mania, and high blood pressure.

Desvenlafaxine was approved for medical use in the United States in 2008. In Europe its application for use was denied in 2009, although has since been approved for Spain and Germany. In 2023, it was the 189th most commonly prescribed medication in the United States, with more than 2 million prescriptions.

== Medical uses ==
Desvenlafaxine is primarily used as a treatment for major depressive disorder. Use has only been studied up to 8 weeks. Multiple studies have shown comparable effectiveness to venlafaxine as well as a lower rate of nausea. Other studies have shown it to be either less effective or more effective than venlafaxine.

Doses of 50 to 400 mg/day appear effective for major depressive disorder, although no additional benefit was demonstrated at doses greater than 50 mg/day, and adverse events and withdrawal symptoms were more frequent at higher doses.

Desvenlafaxine improves the HAM-D17 score and measures of well-being such as the Sheehan Disability Scale (SDS) and 5-item World Health Organization Well-Being Index (WHO-5).

Desvenlafaxine may also be prescribed off-label for the treatment of hot flashes. A review of studies in 2014 found a 55–69% reduction in number of hot flashes.

== Adverse effects ==
Frequency of adverse effects:

Very common adverse effects include:

- Nausea
- Headache
- Dizziness
- Dry mouth
- Hyperhidrosis
- Diarrhea
- Insomnia
- Constipation
- Fatigue

Common adverse effects include:

- Tremor
- Blurred vision
- Mydriasis
- Decreased appetite
- Sexual dysfunction
- Insomnia
- Anxiety
- Elevated cholesterol and triglycerides
- Proteinuria
- Vertigo
- Feeling jittery
- Asthenia
- Nervousness
- Hot flush
- Irritability
- Abnormal dreams
- Urinary hesitation
- Yawning
- Rash

Uncommon adverse effects include:

- Hypersensitivity
- Syncope
- Depersonalization
- Hypomania
- Withdrawal syndrome
- Urinary retention
- Epistaxis (nose bleed)
- Alopecia (hair loss)
- Orthostatic hypotension
- Peripheral coldness

Rare adverse effects include:

- Hyponatraemia (low blood sodium)
- Seizures
- Extrapyramidal side effects
- Hallucinations
- Angioedema
- Photosensitivity reaction
- Stevens–Johnson syndrome

Common adverse effects whose intensity is unknown include:

- Abnormal bleeding (gastrointestinal bleeds)
- Narrow-angle glaucoma
- Mania
- Interstitial lung disease
- Eosinophilic pneumonia
- Hypertension
- Suicidal behavior and thoughts
- Serotonin syndrome

=== Post-SSRI sexual dysfunction ===
Post-SSRI sexual dysfunction (PSSD) is an iatrogenic condition in which sexual side effects persist after discontinuation of serotonin reuptake inhibiting antidepressants, including desvenlafaxine. Characteristic symptoms include genital numbness, pleasureless or weak orgasm, loss of libido, and erectile dysfunction; non-sexual symptoms such as emotional blunting and cognitive impairment may also occur. The condition can arise after even brief exposure to a serotonin reuptake inhibitor and may persist indefinitely; there is currently no established treatment. The DSM-5 noted in 2013 that serotonin reuptake inhibitor-induced sexual dysfunction may persist after the agent is discontinued.

As the primary active metabolite of venlafaxine, desvenlafaxine shares its parent compound's serotonin reuptake inhibiting mechanism, and PSSD has been reported with both drugs. A 2023 retrospective cohort study of over 12,000 males estimated the risk of irreversible sexual dysfunction at approximately 0.46% of patients treated with serotonergic antidepressants, including SNRIs, though the actual prevalence remains uncertain and the condition is likely underreported.

In 2019, the European Medicines Agency's Pharmacovigilance Risk Assessment Committee (PRAC) recommended that product labels for all SSRIs and SNRIs, including desvenlafaxine, be updated to state that sexual dysfunction may be long-lasting even after treatment is stopped. Health Canada followed with similar label updates in 2021. In 2024, Australia's Therapeutic Goods Administration aligned all SSRI and SNRI product information to reflect this risk, noting that desvenlafaxine already carried a warning about persistent sexual dysfunction prior to the alignment.

== Pharmacology ==
Desvenlafaxine is a synthetic form of the isolated major active metabolite of venlafaxine, and is categorized as a serotonin–norepinephrine reuptake inhibitor (SNRI). When most normal metabolizers take venlafaxine, approximately 70% of the dose is metabolized into desvenlafaxine, so the effects of the two drugs are expected to be very similar. It works by blocking the "reuptake" transporters for key neurotransmitters affecting mood, thereby leaving more active neurotransmitters in the synapse. The neurotransmitters affected are serotonin (5-hydroxytryptamine) and norepinephrine (noradrenaline). It is approximately 10 times more potent at inhibiting serotonin uptake than norepinephrine uptake.

Transporter	K_{i}[nM]	IC_{50} [nM]
SERT	40.2	47.3
NET	558.4	531.3

== Society and culture ==
=== Legal status ===
==== United States ====
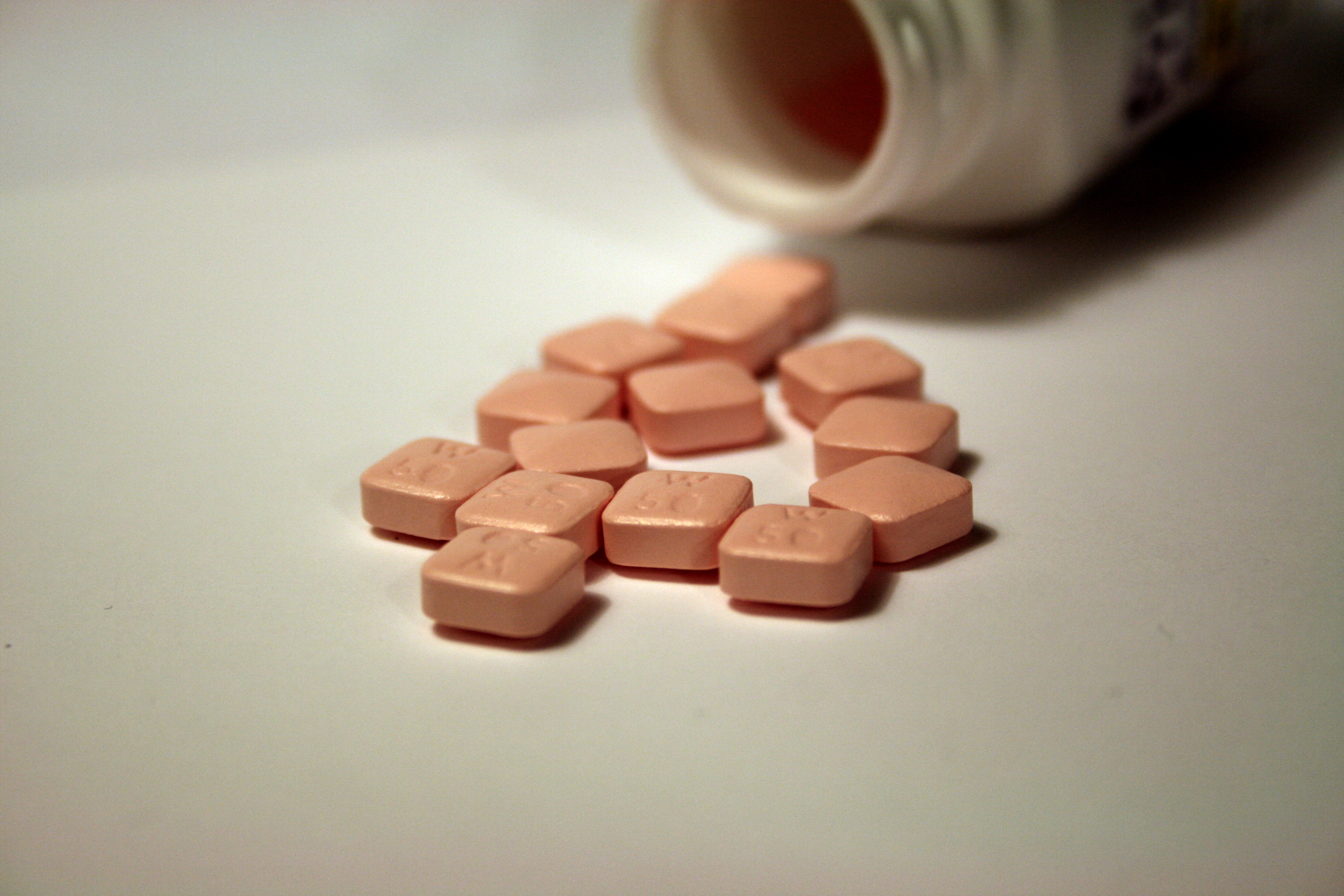
Pristiq 50 mg tablets (US)

Wyeth announced on 23 January 2007 that it received an approvable letter from the Food and Drug Administration for desvenlafaxine. Final approval to sell the drug was contingent on a number of things, including:

- A satisfactory FDA inspection of Wyeth's Guayama, Puerto Rico facility, where the drug is to be manufactured;
- Several postmarketing surveillance commitments, and follow-up studies on low-dose use, relapse, and use in children;
- Clarity by Wyeth around the company's product education plan for physicians and patients;
- Approval of desvenlafaxine's proprietary name, Pristiq.

The FDA approved the drug for antidepressant use in February 2008, and was to be available in US pharmacies in May 2008.

In March 2017, the generic form of the drug was made available in the US.

==== Canada ====
On February 4, 2009, Health Canada approved use of desvenlafaxine for treatment of depression.

==== European Union ====
In 2009, an application to market desvenlafaxine for major depressive disorder in the European Union was declined. In 2012, Pfizer received authorization in Spain to market desvenlafaxine for the disorder. In August 2022, following a 14-year approval process, desvenlafaxine was brought to the market for the disorder in Germany. Desvenlaflaxine has been available in Italy since 2022.

==== Australia ====
Desvenlafaxine is classified as a schedule 4 (prescription only) drug in Australia. It was listed on the Pharmaceutical Benefits Scheme in 2008 for the treatment of major depressive disorders.

== See also ==
- List of antidepressants
