= C18H21ClN2 =

The molecular formula C_{18}H_{21}ClN_{2} may refer to:

- Chlorcyclizine
- 1-(3-Chlorophenyl)-4-(2-phenylethyl)piperazine (3C-PEP)
- Clomacran
- Norclomipramine, also known as N-desmethylclomipramine and chlordesipramine
