= Separation anxiety in dogs =

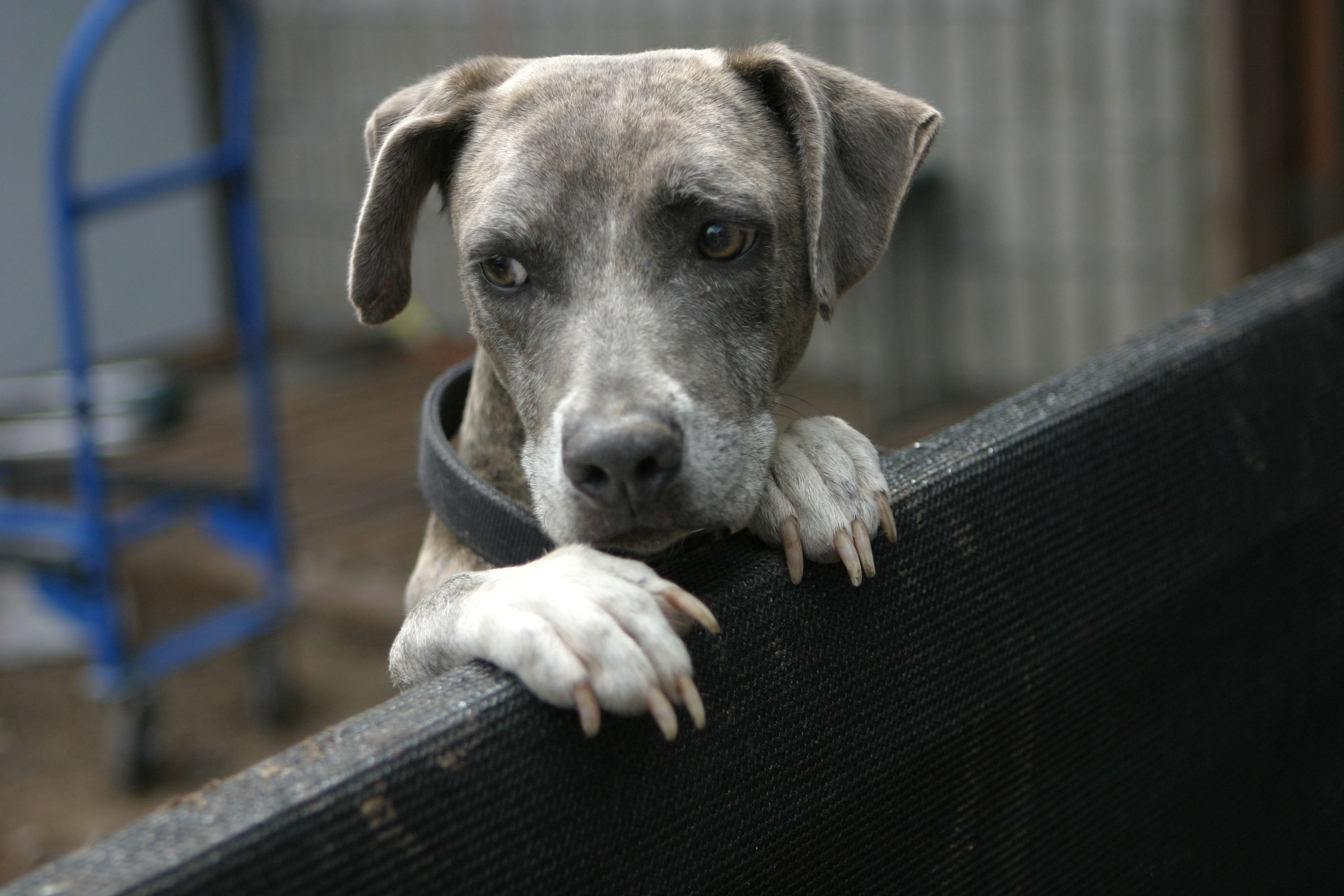

Separation anxiety in dogs describes a condition in which a dog exhibits distress and behavior problems when separated from its handler. Separation anxiety typically manifests within minutes of departure of the handler. It is not fully understood why some dogs suffer from separation anxiety and others do not. The diagnosis process often leads to a misdiagnosis as it is difficult to differentiate from other medical and behavioral problems. The behavior may be secondary to an underlying medical condition. With chronic stress, impairments to physiological health can manifest. Increased stress in the dog alters hormone levels, thus decreasing natural immunity to various health problems. Separation anxiety can be treated with systematic desensitization and, if necessary, medication. Ignoring, punishing, or leaving the dog to "cry it out" does not solve separation anxiety and can damage the mental health of dogs.

== Signs and symptoms ==
Dogs suffering from separation anxiety typically exhibit these behaviors:

- Following handler excessively
- Pacing
- Excessive salivating
- Excessive shaking (usually seen in smaller breeds like the Chihuahua and Yorkshire Terrier)
- Vomiting
- Destructive chewing
- Barking, howling, whining
- Urination, defecation in the house
- Coprophagia
- Self harm
- Digging and scratching at doors or windows in an attempt to reunite with the handler
- Escaping
- Anorexia
- Overactivity (excessive greeting, restlessness)

== Cause ==
The cause of dog separation anxiety is unknown, but may be triggered by:

- a traumatic event
- a change in routine
- major life change (e.g., new home, new baby, death of a family member, abandonment to a shelter)
- extreme attachment or dependency on the owner

== Diagnosis ==
It can be difficult to differentiate separation anxiety from other disorders in dogs since there are no specific diagnostic tests available. There is no known genetic component to this disorder; it can occur at any point in the dog's life but has been shown to coincide with times of stress and major life changes.

A 1986 study showed mixed breed dogs were significantly more likely to have separation anxiety than purebred dogs. The researchers noted a confounding factor that in the study population, a higher percentage of the mixed breed dogs were obtained from a shelter and possibly had traumatic histories that impacted the likelihood of a separation anxiety diagnosis.

Diagnoses are made by examining dogs' behaviour before and during departure, when the owner is absent, and when the owner returns home. It is encouraged by pet professionals to record behavioural responses after departure to increase the probability of an accurate diagnosis. By observing the dogs behaviour, professionals can exclude external factors that could influence the behaviour that would not have been identifiable without the recording. Repetitive behaviours and autonomic responses such as tachycardia, tachypnea, and trembling may also be identified on a recording in the owners absence. As some of the behaviours presented by the canine could be related to other medical or behavioural problems, behavioural response characteristics must be examined to provide an accurate diagnosis.

Urination and defecation are prominent behavioural response within canines experiencing separation anxiety. Elimination must only occur within one to thirty minutes after companions departure or when the canine is prevented from being near its companion. Destructive behaviour to its environment or itself can also be present immediately after departure of the owner. Behavioural responses such as chewing, digging, and scratching could apply to any personal objects or areas in the environment, but is usually directed towards possible exits (i.e., doors and windows). Vocal responses such as whining, howling, and barking could precede departure and/or begin following departure. This may persist for a longer period in comparison to other behavioural responses presented preceding departure of the owner. In severe cases, excessive vocalization can lead to damage to the dog's voice box, losing the ability to bark or howl for a period. Behaviours need not persist until return of the owner, apart from vocalization, but may be present at arrival. As well, the above behaviours must be correlated with signs of distress and restlessness within the period of time leading to or immediately after the behavioural response.

=== Common misdiagnoses ===
As behaviours presented through separation anxiety can be linked to many other behavioural and medical disorders, careful diagnostic criteria must be followed.

As a preventative measure, and to exclude other possible explanations for the behavioural responses, diagnostic testing is performed. A physical examination is performed, and tests relating to the animals age and medical history may be required. In relation to the elimination behaviour, a urinalysis is suggested and a stool sample may be required if it presents as abnormal or the dog is expressing other digestive issues.

==== Medical problems ====
- Urinary incontinence related to medical problems
  - A large number of medical problems can influence canine house soiling, including urinary tract infection, weak sphincter caused by old age, hormone-related problems, bladder stones, diabetes mellitus, abnormalities of the genitalia, and neurological problems. It is most common among large breed, spayed female dogs, but it can occur in intact females, male dogs, and cats. Urethral sphincter incompetence is the primary cause of urinary incontinence. It is important to seek veterinary aid if urinary incontinence presents frequently.
- Medication
  - Medication can affect canine behaviour in relation to elimination, destruction, and vocalization. If negative behavioural patterns persist in relation to these symptoms, it is important to seek veterinary advice. It may be necessary to change or adjust the canine's prescription if it is inducing negative behavioural responses.

==== Behavioural related-problems ====
- Incomplete housetraining
  - In the case of house training issues, there is no pattern or correlation within the behaviours, as elimination, destruction, and vocalization frequencies do not change. However, it is more prominent in younger dogs. Behavioural responses related to incomplete housetraining do not exhibit distress or restlessness and the canine is usually not aware that they are participating in a wrongful behaviour.
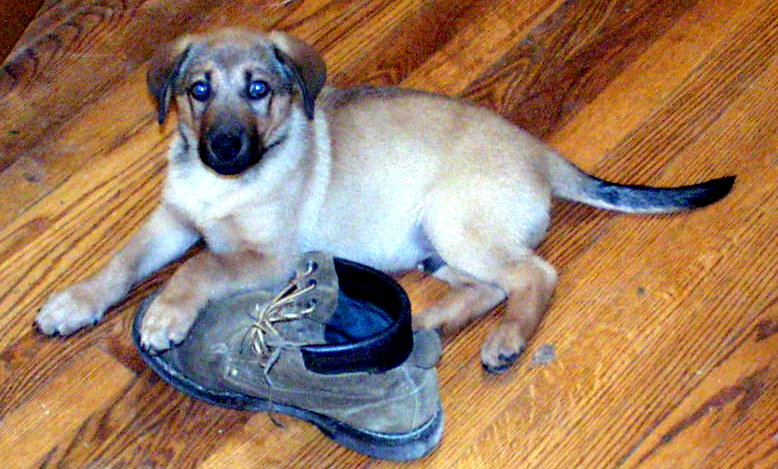
    Canine participating in destruction of personal items.
- Submissive and excitement urination
  - Submissive and excitement-related urination usually presents in puppies and the behaviour reduces with age. Excitement-related urination occurs during greetings or playtime, however urination can occur due to submissive behaviour which can be related to fear and nervousness. In these cases, the dog may change its posture, approaching or fleeing individuals with its head and tail pointed downward, crouching, and/or rolling over and exposing its belly; presenting submissiveness.
- Urine and fecal marking
  - Marking can occur under normal circumstances as it is primarily performed as a territorial mechanism towards other animals. However, it is not normal for this behaviour to reoccur in the household or in the absence of a threatening stimulus. A possible explanation behind the inappropriate occurrence of this behaviour could be due to the canine being threatened or exposed to an unsafe environment. As a stress-related response to territory disturbance, alteration, or invasion by another species, dogs can also engage in this behavior.
- Boredom
  - Lack of attention given to the dog can induce the animal to exhibit behaviours such as elimination (i.e., urinating), destruction (i.e., chewing and/or scratching personal and household items), as well as vocalization (i.e., whine, bark, or howl) in the absence of a stimuli. As this predominantly occurs while the owner is away as a form of entertainment, it can occur during departure or upon arrival, to obtain attention. Behavioural responses initiated due to boredom are more prominent in younger canines and can be correlated with juvenile destruction (i.e., incomplete housetraining).
- Abuse
  - Behavioural and emotional responses that are consistent with those of separation anxiety can be side-effects of abuse. This is commonly found in rescue or shelter dogs. As abuse side-effects can be misunderstood as separation anxiety, a history of abuse can also contribute to separation anxiety.

== Treatment ==
Dogs suffering from separation anxiety are often "owner addicts." While treatment and management options are available for dogs suffering from separation anxiety, there is no instant cure. However, the disorder can dissipate on its own if the trigger stimulus is removed from its environment or the trigger stimulus is desensitized over a period. The canine may not suffer from separation anxiety on a long-term basis if training, consistent routines, lifestyle changes, or medication is in place. A better prognosis is achieved by providing treatment.

=== Drug therapy ===
Dogs can be treated with psychotropic drugs used to treat similar psychological disorders displayed in humans to mitigate the behavior related to these disorders, such as anti-depressants or anti-anxiety drugs. These connections between human and animal psychopharmacology can help to explain how similar neurobiology can be among different species. Selective serotonin reuptake inhibitors, or SSRIs, or tricyclic anti-depressants are used to treat anxious and depressive behavior in animals. One study tracked the effectiveness of clomipramine, a tricyclic anti-depressant, in reducing compulsive behaviors in dogs. Behaviors displayed by these dogs include but are not limited to tail-chasing, shadow-chasing, circling and chewing. The study found that after one month of daily administration of the tricyclic anti-depressant clomipramine, these compulsive behaviors decreased or disappeared in 16 out of 24 dogs. Slight to moderate behavior mitigation was shown in 5 dogs. These results suggest that clomipramine can be beneficial to canines displaying anxiety behaviors.

==== Anti-depressant treatment ====
Fluoxetine, an SSRI used by humans under the brand name Prozac, is prescribed to dogs under the brand name Reconcile. A study found that dogs who were being simultaneously treated with Reconcile while undergoing a type of behavior therapy known as behavioral modulation were more successful at mitigating behaviors related to separation anxiety when compared to the control group of dogs receiving only a placebo with behavior modulation treatment. After 8 weeks of treatment, 72% of the dogs given fluoxetine displayed fewer adverse behaviors (e.g., excessive salivation, inappropriate urination/defecation) while only 50% of the control group mitigated these behaviors.

In another study conducted in 2015, dogs expressing symptoms of separation anxiety were given fluoxetine tablets and a standard behavior modification plan for two months. Owner interviews, spatial cognitive bias tests, questionnaires and relations between cognitive bias and drug treatment were all taken into consideration. Results showed that the clinical treatment of fluoxetine seemed to produce a shift in cognitive bias in the canine subjects, emphasizing that pharmacological therapy not only can positively affect behavior, but also an animal's psychological state.

The most common adverse effects were decreased appetite, experienced by 23% of the dogs in the study, and lethargy, experienced by 39% of the dogs in the study. Some canines actually experienced worsening anxiety and aggressive behavior.

In a study using the anti-depressant clomipramine, nine dogs underwent withdrawal after discontinuing treatment. Five of those dogs were successful in overcoming the withdrawal, while four dogs relapsed. Although the study's sample sizes were relatively small, it illuminated one of the many variables regarding psychoactive drug withdrawal.

==== Benzodiazepine treatment ====
Benzodiazepines, such as alprazolam, are anxiolytic medications. Benzodiazepines are beneficial in the treatment of stimuli-evoking anxiety, or phobias. One study on storm phobias found that 30 out of the 32 canines involved in the study had reductions in anxious behaviors after being treated with alprazolam. However, this study found that the best way to benefit from benzodiazepine treatment is when it is being used in conjunction with behavior modulation treatment and an anti-depressant.

The study found that canines can develop dependence to these types of medications and experience a withdrawal process similar to one experienced by humans. For example, their seizure threshold is lowered and anxiety relapse can occur after stopping benzodiazepine treatment. Similarly to treatment of human anxiety disorders, benzodiazepines are a last resort treatment, due to their addiction potential. Selective serotonin reuptake inhibitors, or SSRIs, or tricyclic anti-depressants are used to treat anxious and depressive behavior in animals. One study tracked the effectiveness of clomipramine, a tricyclic anti-depressant, in reducing compulsive behaviors in dogs. Behaviors displayed by these dogs include but are not limited to tail-chasing, shadow-chasing, circling and chewing. The study found that after one month of daily administration of the tricyclic anti-depressant clomipramine, these compulsive behaviors decreased or disappeared in 16 out of 24 dogs. Slight to moderate behavior mitigation was shown in 5 dogs. These results suggest that clomipramine can be beneficial to canines displaying anxiety behaviors.

Imepitoin, also known by its brand name Pexion, is a recently developed drug for treating primarily canine epilepsy. Imepitoin is a low-affinity agonist at the benzodiazepine site of the GABA_{A} receptor, meaning it is able to loosely attach itself to the GABA receptor and mimic GABA. Gamma-aminobutyric acid (GABA) is a neurotransmitter that is used to counteract glutamate, the excitatory neurotransmitter responsible for eliciting anxious behaviors if levels are excessive, causing long-term anxiety disorders. Because imepitoin is known to have anti-convulsant effects on laboratory rats and is already an anti-epilepsy drug treatment, researchers are curious as to whether or not it could decrease a canine's levels of separation anxiety, as one symptom of separation anxiety in dogs is excessive shaking, primarily in smaller breeds.

One study conducted in 2016 did not test its effects on separation anxiety specifically, but rather investigated its abilities to reduce fear and anxiety-related behaviors. The study was conducted via an online survey completed by the canine participants' owners, including data on the number of how monthly seizures the dogs experienced. Results showed a significant reduction of average seizures per month, but no significant differences in behavior regarding the five anxiety-related measures examined (dog-directed fear, stranger-directed fear, non-social fear, pain sensitivity and separation-related behavior), concluding that imepitoin did not definitively affect anxiety-related behavior in dogs. However, it was noted by researchers conducting the study that the participants' anxiety levels could not have been high enough in the beginning of the study for the dogs to show a significant reduction in anxiety-related behavior.

Another research study in June 2017 tested imepitoin's abilities to reduce anxiety-related behaviors in canines, but unlike the previous study, researchers evaluated the dogs personally for canine temperament using a Positive and Negative Activation Scale (PANAS), rather than having the participants' owners evaluate the dogs through an online survey. Average weekly reaction (AWR) scores in response to anxiety-inducing stimuli and owners' diary entries were also taken into account. Results displayed significantly lower AWR scores for anxiety alongside a reduction in negative activation on the PANAS, concluding that imepitoin is a drug-therapy option to positively reduce canines' anxiety-related behaviors. However, imepitoin is not being prescribed to treat separation anxiety in canines.

==== Environmental management ====
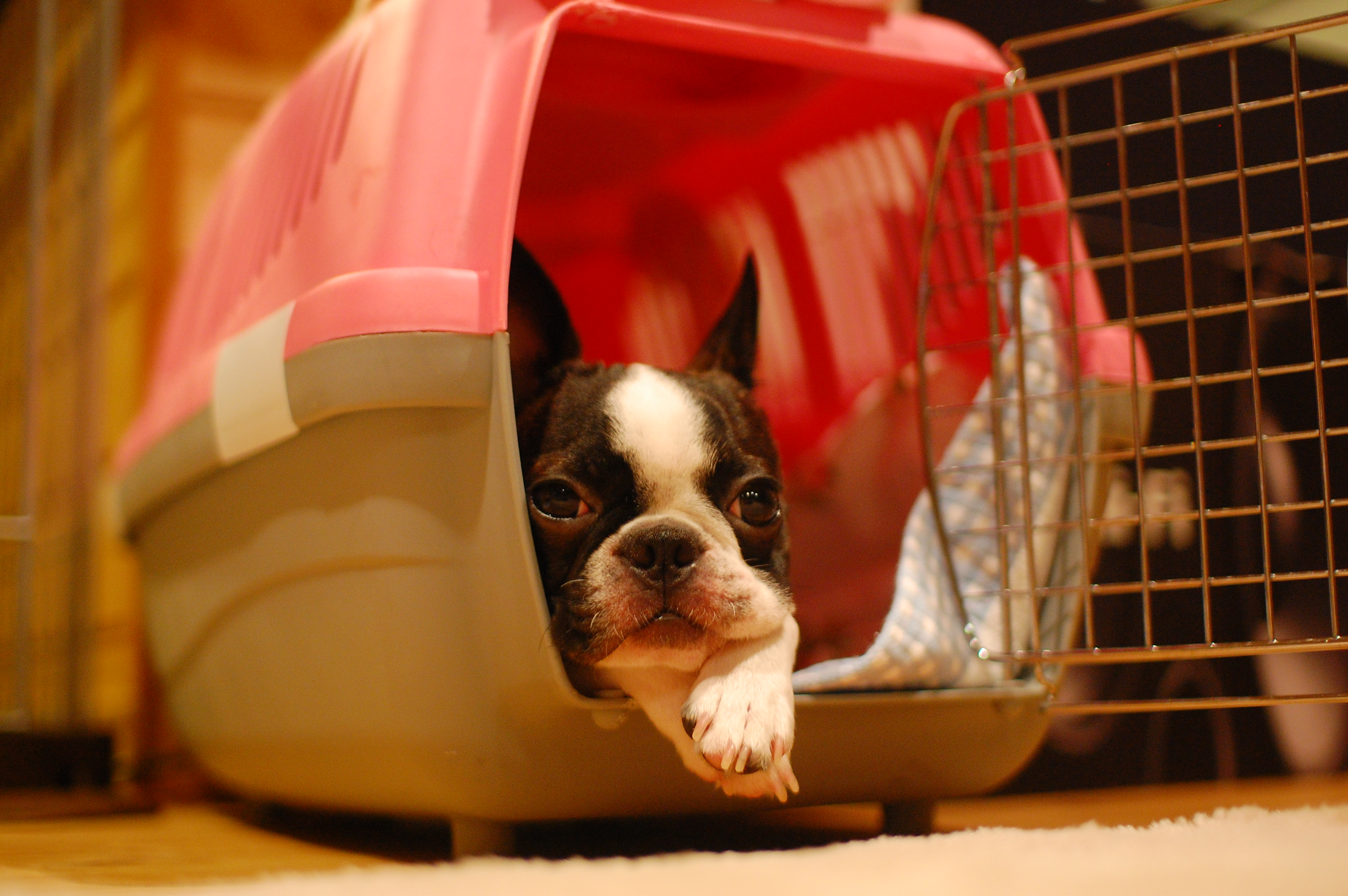
Boston Terrier in crate.

Managing and controlling the canine environment is one method used to help treat separation anxiety in dogs. The focus is to reduce the canine's anxiety while eliminating possible means of self-injury or harm to the surrounding environment. In the cases of some dogs, crate training can provide an effective enclosure in which the canine feels safe and comfortable, whilst eliminating possible means of harm in the environment, as they are enclosed. The use of a crate or small, enclosed structure is effective for dogs who have been accustomed to crate training before, however introducing this method past the accustomed age of house training, can worsen the symptoms experienced by the dog. As well, confining a dog who is unaccustomed to the crate or enclosure environment can increase a stress induced behavioural response known as lip licking. Self-harm and injury to the animal can also increase as confinement can cause distress leading to the canine trying to escape.

Another method used to reduce distress in dogs experiencing separation anxiety is the use of a dog-appeasing pheromone. Studies proved that 83 percent of dogs exposed to a pheromone, in the absence of their owner, experienced reduced stress and anxiety; 70% of dogs prescribed clomipramine, a psychotropic drug, experienced said reduction in separation-induced symptoms. The dog-appeasing pheromone (DAP), also known as apasine, is a pheromone secreted by lactating females by the sebaceous glands in the intermammary sulcus. Young and adult canines detect the pheromone through the Jacobson's organ or vomero-nasal organ (VNO), and in result, detection ameliorates symptoms related to separation anxiety, phobias, and hyper-attachment. Synthetic forms of dog-appeasing pheromone, such as Adaptil, have been developed by the pharmaceutical industry for over-the-counter use, however their efficacy is reduced in comparison to natural DAP. As the stimulus, absence of owner and behavioural responses relating to separation anxiety are present, exposure to small intervals of owners' absence can condition the behavioural responses to change and become calm and positive. Absence period is gradually extended up to a suitable period of time of which anxiety-induced behavioural responses no longer occur.

==== Behavioural management ====
Behavioural management consists of several non-medication type treatments that reduce the effects of separation anxiety on the dog and homeowners. A behavioural technique found to aid in management of the disorder is to cease all forms of punishment related to the animals behaviour. Punishment in cases of separation anxiety does not reduce the behaviour or anxiety levels of dogs; it increases their stress levels, prolonging the symptoms and behavioural responses induced by separation.

Systematic desensitization is a technique used to reduce anxiety-induced behavioural responses; is based on classical conditioning. As the stimulus, absence of owner and behavioural responses relating to separation anxiety are present, exposure to small intervals of owners' absence can condition the behavioural responses to change and become calm and positive. Absence period is gradually extended up to a suitable period of time of which anxiety-induced behavioural responses no longer occur. By repeatedly demonstrating short owner absence times, non-anxious behaviour over longer absence times is eventually encouraged. The main goal of this step is to extend absence time where the canine does not experience separation-related behaviour problems; reducing anxiety for the dog and homeowner. It is important that the canine does not experience a traumatic event during this training, otherwise desensitization will not be successful. Counterconditioning is also used in conjunction with systematic desensitization; the intent to change an animal's emotional response to a stimulus. Counterconditioning is achieved by pairing the stimulus that elicits the negative response with a stimulus that elicits a positive response, thus changing the emotional response from fear and anxiety to calm and positive. The canine is conditioned to associate the fearful stimuli with a positive outcome (e.g., given toy or food during departure of owner). Treatment had a greater success rate when systematic desensitization and counterconditioning were paired; canines treated by Rogerson with systematic desensitization and counterconditioning for anxiety-related behavioural responses had a 100% success rate.

When leaving the house, or while still within the household, but out of sight, an important strategy to employ is to ignore clingy or attention-seeking behavior. Responding to canines' attention-seeking behaviours can also be related to operant conditioning; positively reinforcing the behaviour increases the likelihood of the behavioural response to re-occur, however the use of negative punishment (i.e., not acknowledging behaviour) will reduce attention-seeking behavioural responses, which reduces the dog's dependency on the owner.

== Research ==
A study conducted in 2016 used primary metabolite profiling through a combination of liquid chromatography and mass spectrometry to identify possible biomarkers for anxiety-related behavior. Primary metabolites are directly involved in more "natural" processes, such as reproduction and development, so abnormal differences could result in differences of mental development. Results identified changes in thirteen metabolites between dogs who had separation anxiety and those who did not; these changes included differences in hypoxanthine, indoxysulfate and phospholipids, all which control oxidative stress, tryptophan levels, and lipid metabolisms. Researchers concluded that biomarkers like primary metabolites play a prominent role in canine anxiety.
