= Fluvoxamine =

SSRI antidepressant

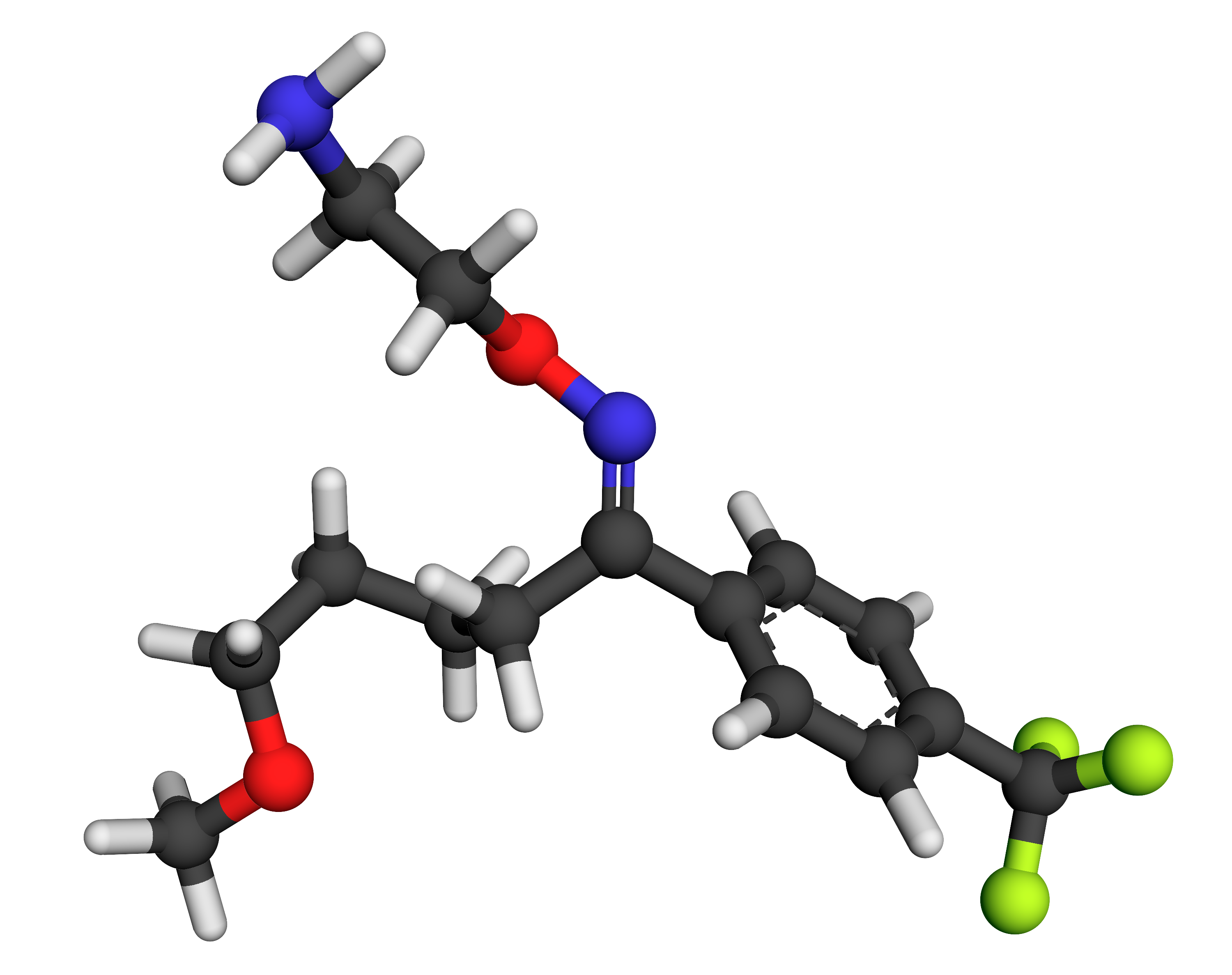

Clinical data
- Pronunciation: floo-VAHK-sə-meen UK: /fluːˈvɒksəmiːn/ US: /fluːˈvɑːksəˌmiːn/
- Trade names: Luvox, others
- AHFS/Drugs.com: Monograph
- MedlinePlus: a695004
- License data: US DailyMed: Fluvoxamine
- Pregnancy category: AU: C
- Routes of administration: By mouth
- Drug class: Selective serotonin reuptake inhibitor (SSRI)
- ATC code: N06AB08 (WHO)

Legal status
- Legal status: AU: S4 (Prescription only); BR: Class C1 (Other controlled substances); CA: ℞-only; UK: POM (Prescription only); US: ℞-only

Pharmacokinetic data
- Bioavailability: 53% (90% confidence interval: 44–62%)
- Protein binding: 77–80%
- Metabolism: Liver (primarily O-demethylation); Major: CYP2D6 or CYP1A2; Minor: CYP3A4, CYP2C19, and/or CYP1A2
- Elimination half-life: 12–13 hours (single dose), 22 hours (repeated dosing)
- Excretion: Kidney (98%; 94% as metabolites, 4% as unchanged drug)

Identifiers
- IUPAC name: 2-{[(E)-{5-Methoxy-1-[4-(trifluoromethyl)phenyl] pentylidene}amino]oxy}ethanamine
- CAS Number: 54739-18-3
- PubChem CID: 5324346
- IUPHAR/BPS: 7189
- DrugBank: DB00176
- ChemSpider: 4481878
- UNII: O4L1XPO44W
- KEGG: D07984
- ChEBI: CHEBI:5138
- ChEMBL: ChEMBL814
- CompTox Dashboard (EPA): DTXSID2044002
- ECHA InfoCard: 100.125.476

Chemical and physical data
- Formula: C_{15}H_{21}F_{3}N_{2}O_{2}
- Molar mass: 318.340 g·mol^{−1}
- 3D model (JSmol): Interactive image
- SMILES: FC(F)(F)c1ccc(\C(=N\OCCN)CCCCOC)cc1
- InChI: InChI=1S/C15H21F3N2O2/c1-21-10-3-2-4-14(20-22-11-9-19)12-5-7-13(8-6-12)15(16,17)18/h5-8H,2-4,9-11,19H2,1H3/b20-14+; Key:CJOFXWAVKWHTFT-XSFVSMFZSA-N

Fluvoxamine, sold under the brand name Luvox among others, is an antidepressant of the selective serotonin reuptake inhibitor (SSRI) class. It is primarily used to treat major depressive disorder and, perhaps more especially, obsessive–compulsive disorder (OCD), but is also used to treat anxiety disorders such as panic disorder, social anxiety disorder, and post-traumatic stress disorder.

Fluvoxamine's side-effect profile is similar to that of other SSRIs. Common adverse effects include constipation, gastrointestinal problems, headache, anxiety, irritation, sexual problems, dry mouth, sleep problems, and an increased risk of suicide at the start of treatment. These effects appear to be significantly weaker than with other SSRIs, with the exception of gastrointestinal side-effects. In some patients, sexual dysfunction may persist even after the drug is discontinued, a condition known as post-SSRI sexual dysfunction; regulatory agencies including the European Medicines Agency and Health Canada have recommended that fluvoxamine's product labeling warn of this risk.

Fluvoxamine appears to be more tolerable than other SSRIs, particularly with respect to cardiovascular complications.

It is on the World Health Organization's List of Essential Medicines.

== Medical uses ==
In many countries (e.g., Australia, the United Kingdom, and Russia) it is commonly used for major depressive disorder. Fluvoxamine is also approved in the United States for obsessive–compulsive disorder (OCD), and social anxiety disorder. In Japan, it is also approved to treat OCD, social anxiety disorder, and major depressive disorder. Fluvoxamine is indicated for children and adolescents with OCD. The NICE guidelines in the United Kingdom have, as of 2005, authorized its use for OCD in adults and adolescents of any age and children over the age of 7.

There is evidence that fluvoxamine is effective for generalised social anxiety in adults, although, as with other SSRIs, some of the results may be compromised by having been funded by pharmaceutical companies. Of the SSRIs, however, fluvoxamine, paroxetine, and sertraline do appear consistent as viable treatments for generalised social anxiety.

Fluvoxamine is also effective for treating a range of anxiety disorders in children and adolescents, including generalized anxiety disorder, social anxiety disorder, panic disorder, and separation anxiety disorder.

The drug works long-term, and retains its therapeutic efficacy for at least one year.

The average therapeutic dose for fluvoxamine is 100 to 300 mg/day, with 300 mg being the upper daily limit normally recommended. OCD, however, often requires higher doses; doses of up to 450 mg/day may be prescribed in this case. The (off-label) upper daily limits for other serotonin-reuptake inhibitors used in the treatment of OCD, by analogy, are 400 mg for sertraline, 100 mg for paroxetine, 120 mg for both fluoxetine and citalopram, 60 mg for escitalopram and 300 mg for clomipramine.

In any case with fluvoxamine, treatment is generally begun at 50 mg and increased in 50 mg increments every 4 to 7 days until a therapeutic optimum is reached.

== Adverse effects ==
Fluvoxamine's side-effect profile is very similar to other SSRIs. Gastrointestinal side effects are characteristic of those receiving treatment with fluvoxamine. However, compared to escitalopram and sertraline, fluvoxamine's gastrointestinal profile may be less intense, often being limited to nausea. Mosapride has demonstrated efficacy in treating fluvoxamine-induced nausea. It is also advised practice to divide total daily doses of fluvoxamine greater than 100 mg, with the higher fraction being taken in the evening (e.g., 50 mg at the beginning of the waking day and 200 mg at bedtime). In any case, high starting daily doses of fluvoxamine rather than the recommended gradual titration (starting at 50 mg and gradually titrating, up to 300 mg if necessary) may increase the likelihood of nausea.

In comparison to other SSRIs, fluvoxamine has the second highest rate of causing discontinuation syndrome, as a result of the low half-life of fluvoxamine.

=== Common ===
Common side effects occurring with 1–10% incidence:

- Abdominal pain
- Agitation
- Anxiety
- Asthenia (weakness)
- Constipation
- Diarrhea
- Dizziness
- Dyspepsia (indigestion)
- Headache
- Hyperhidrosis (excess sweating)
- Insomnia
- Loss of appetite
- Malaise
- Nausea
- Nervousness
- Palpitations
- Restlessness
- Sexual dysfunction (including delayed ejaculation, erectile dysfunction, decreased libido, etc.)
- Somnolence (drowsiness)
- Tachycardia (high heart rate)
- Tremor
- Vomiting
- Weight loss
- Xerostomia (dry mouth)
- Yawning

=== Uncommon ===
Uncommon side effects occurring with 0.1–1% incidence:

- Arthralgia
- Confusional state
- Cutaneous hypersensitivity reactions (e.g. oedema [buildup of fluid in the tissues], rash, pruritus)
- Extrapyramidal side effects (e.g. dystonia, parkinsonism, tremor, etc.)
- Hallucination
- Orthostatic hypotension

=== Rare ===
Rare side effects occurring with 0.01–0.1% incidence:

- Abnormal hepatic (liver) function
- Galactorrhoea (expulsion of breast milk unrelated to pregnancy or breastfeeding)
- Mania
- Photosensitivity (being abnormally sensitive to light)
- Seizures

=== Unknown frequency ===
- Akathisia – a sense of inner restlessness that presents itself with the inability to stay still
- Bed-wetting
- Bone fractures
- Dysgeusia
- Ecchymoses
- Glaucoma
- Haemorrhage
- Hyperprolactinaemia (elevated plasma prolactin levels leading to galactorrhoea, amenorrhoea [cessation of menstrual cycles], etc.)
- Hyponatraemia
- Mydriasis
- Neuroleptic malignant syndrome – practically identical presentation to serotonin syndrome except with a more prolonged onset
- Paraesthesia
- Serotonin syndrome – a potentially fatal condition characterised by abrupt onset muscle rigidity, hyperthermia (elevated body temperature), rhabdomyolysis, mental status changes (e.g. coma, hallucinations, agitation), etc.
- Suicidal ideation and behaviour
- Syndrome of inappropriate antidiuretic hormone secretion
- Urinary incontinence
- Urinary retention
- Violence toward others
- Weight changes
- Withdrawal symptoms

=== Post-SSRI sexual dysfunction ===
Post-SSRI sexual dysfunction (PSSD) is an iatrogenic condition in which sexual side effects persist after discontinuation of serotonin reuptake inhibiting antidepressants, including fluvoxamine. Characteristic symptoms include genital numbness, pleasureless or weak orgasm, loss of libido, and erectile dysfunction; non-sexual symptoms such as emotional blunting and cognitive impairment may also occur. The condition can arise after even brief exposure to a serotonin reuptake inhibitor and may persist indefinitely; there is currently no established treatment. The DSM-5 noted in 2013 that serotonin reuptake inhibitor-induced sexual dysfunction may persist after the agent is discontinued.

A 2023 retrospective cohort study of over 12,000 males estimated the risk of irreversible sexual dysfunction at approximately 0.46% of patients treated with serotonergic antidepressants, including SSRIs, though the actual prevalence remains uncertain and the condition is likely underreported. A 2023 systematic review noted that while data on fluvoxamine is more limited than for some other SSRIs, it was included in the EMA's class-wide signal assessment and cases have been reported with SNRIs, SRI tricyclic antidepressants, and other serotonin reuptake inhibiting drugs in addition to SSRIs. A citizen petition submitted to regulators in 2018 suggested that SNRIs and other serotonin reuptake inhibiting drugs, including fluvoxamine, may be less likely to induce PSSD than SSRIs, though this remains unconfirmed.

In 2019, the European Medicines Agency's Pharmacovigilance Risk Assessment Committee (PRAC) reviewed evidence on fluvoxamine as part of its class-wide signal assessment and recommended that product labels for all SSRIs and SNRIs be updated to state that sexual dysfunction may be long-lasting even after treatment is stopped. Health Canada followed with similar label updates in 2021. In 2024, Australia's Therapeutic Goods Administration aligned all SSRI and SNRI product information to reflect this risk; fluvoxamine was among the products requiring updated warnings.

== Interactions ==
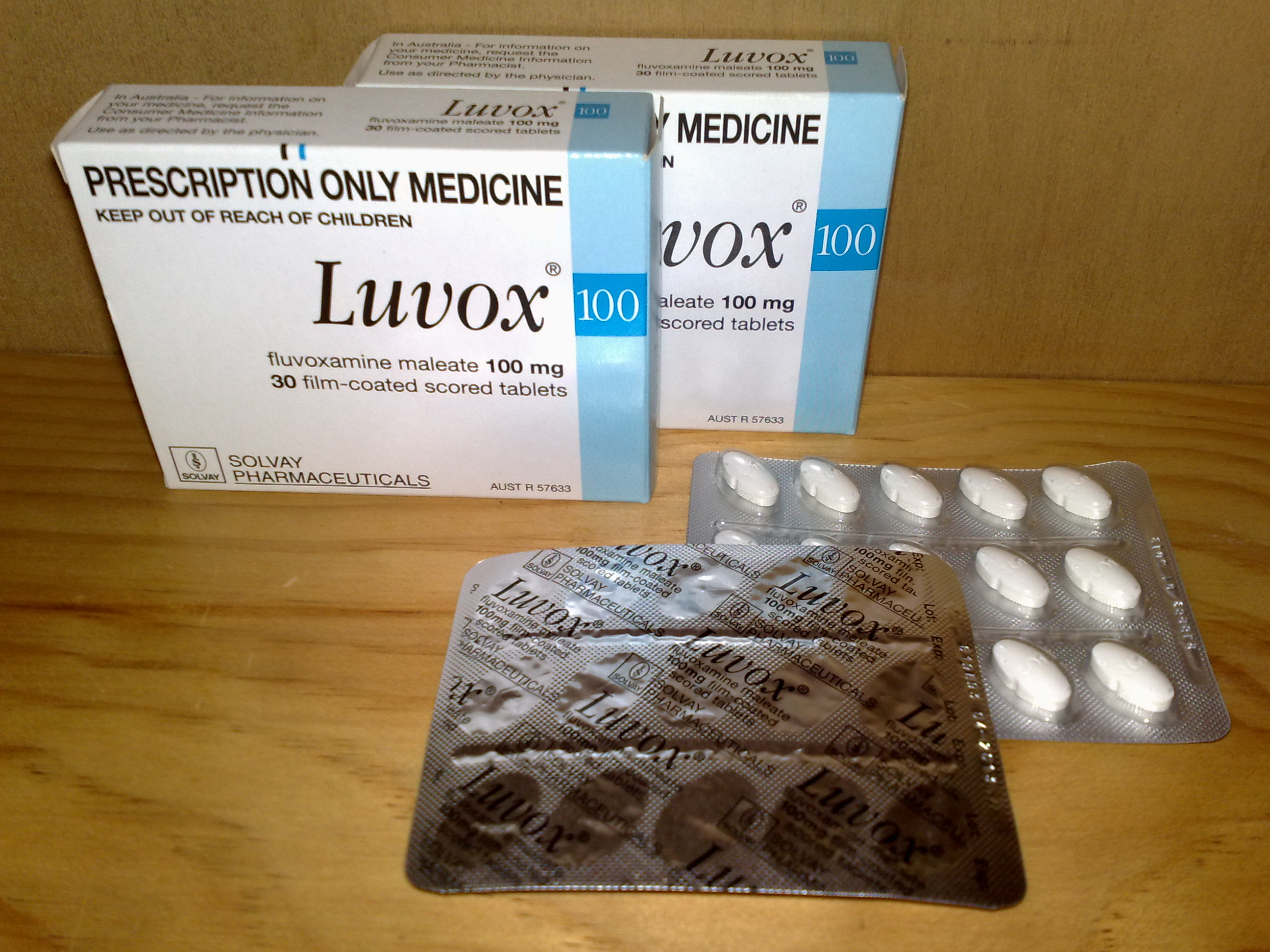
Luvox (fluvoxamine) 100 mg film-coated scored tablets

Fluvoxamine inhibits the following cytochrome P450 enzymes:

- CYP1A2 (strongly) which metabolizes agomelatine, amitriptyline, caffeine, clomipramine, clozapine, duloxetine, haloperidol, imipramine, phenacetin, tacrine, tamoxifen, theophylline, olanzapine, etc.
- CYP3A4 (moderately) which metabolizes alprazolam, aripiprazole, clozapine, haloperidol, quetiapine, pimozide, ziprasidone, etc.
- CYP2D6 (weakly) which metabolizes aripiprazole, chlorpromazine, clozapine, codeine, fluoxetine, haloperidol, olanzapine, oxycodone, paroxetine, perphenazine, pethidine, risperidone, sertraline, thioridazine, zuclopenthixol, etc.
- CYP2C9 (moderately) which metabolizes nonsteroidal anti-inflammatory drugs, phenytoin, sulfonylureas, etc.
- CYP2C19 (strongly) which metabolizes clonazepam, diazepam, phenytoin, etc.
- CYP2B6 (weakly) which metabolizes bupropion, cyclophosphamide, sertraline, tamoxifen, valproate, etc.

By so doing, fluvoxamine can increase serum concentration of the substrates of these enzymes.

Fluvoxamine may also elevate plasma levels of olanzapine by approximately two times. Combined olanzapine and fluvoxamine, which may cause increased sedation, should be used cautiously and controlled clinically and by therapeutic drug monitoring to avoid olanzapine induced adverse effects and/or intoxication.

The plasma levels of oxidatively metabolized benzodiazepines (e.g., triazolam, midazolam, alprazolam, and diazepam) are likely to be increased when co-administered with fluvoxamine. However, the clearance of benzodiazepines metabolized by glucuronidation (e.g., lorazepam; oxazepam, which is coincidentally a metabolite of diazepam; temazepam) are not affected by fluvoxamine and may be safely taken alongside fluvoxamine should concurrent treatment with a benzodiazepine be necessary. Additionally, it appears that benzodiazepines metabolized by nitro-reduction (clonazepam, nitrazepam) may also, in a somewhat similar vein, be unlikely to be affected by fluvoxamine.

Using fluvoxamine and alprazolam together can increase alprazolam plasma concentrations. If alprazolam is coadministered with fluvoxamine, the initial alprazolam dose should be reduced to the lowest effective dose.

As with all SSRI medications, using fluvoxamine with NSAIDs like ibuprofen may increase the risk of bleeding, particularly in the GI tract.

Fluvoxamine is contraindicated with other medications that increase serotonin (dextromethorphan, ondansetron, amphetamine, sumatriptan, Tramadol, Hypericum perforatum, etc.). Combining these medications may rarely lead to a life-threatening complication known as serotonin syndrome.

Fluvoxamine and ramelteon coadministration is not indicated.

Fluvoxamine has been observed to increase serum concentrations of mirtazapine, which is mainly metabolized by CYP1A2, CYP2D6, and CYP3A4, by three- to four-fold in humans. Caution and adjustment of dosage as necessary are warranted when combining fluvoxamine and mirtazapine.

Fluvoxamine seriously affects the pharmacokinetics of tizanidine and increases the intensity and duration of its effects. Because of the potentially hazardous consequences, the concomitant use of tizanidine with fluvoxamine, or other potent inhibitors of CYP1A2, should be avoided.

When a beta-blocker is required, atenolol, pindolol and, possibly, metoprolol may be safer choices than propranolol, as the latter's metabolism is seriously, potentially dangerously, inhibited by fluvoxamine. Indeed, fluvoxamine may increase propranolol blood-levels by five-fold.

Clomipramine increases fluvoxamine levels and, conversely-likewise, fluvoxamine increases clomipramine levels (thereby its serotonergic potential) and inhibits its metabolism to its strongly-noradrenergic metabolite, norclomipramine.

== Pharmacology ==
=== Pharmacodynamics ===
Receptor affinity profile
Site	K_{i} (nM)
SERT	2.5
NET	1427
5-HT_{2C}	5786
α_{1}-adrenergic	1288
σ_{1}	36

Fluvoxamine is a potent selective serotonin reuptake inhibitor with around 100-fold affinity for the serotonin transporter over the norepinephrine transporter. It has negligible affinity for the dopamine transporter or any other site, with the sole exception of the σ_{1} receptor. It behaves as a potent agonist at this receptor and has the highest affinity (36 nM) of any SSRI for doing so. This may contribute to its antidepressant and anxiolytic effects and may also afford it some efficacy in treating the cognitive symptoms of depression. It increases concentrations of the neurosteroid allopregnanolone, which may also contribute to its anxiolytic effects. Unlike some other SSRIs, fluvoxamine's metabolites are pharmacologically neutral.

=== Pharmacokinetics ===
Literature reviews have stated that fluvoxamine is metabolized primarily by CYP2D6 and to a minor extent by CYP1A2. However, CYP2D6 poor metabolizers do not have considerably higher fluvoxamine levels than extensive metabolizers. Fluvoxamine inhibits oxidative drug metabolising enzymes (particularly CYP1A2, and less potently CYP3A4 and CYP2D6) The mean plasma half-life of fluvoxamine after multiple oral doses of 100 mg/day in healthy, young volunteers was 13.6-15.6 hours. In the elderly, however the half life ranged from 17.4 to 25.9. Steady-state plasma fluvoxamine concentrations were 2-3 fold higher in children than in adolescents.

== History ==
Fluvoxamine was developed by Kali-Duphar, part of Solvay Pharmaceuticals, Belgium, now Abbott Laboratories, and introduced as Floxyfral in Switzerland in 1983. It was approved by the U.S. Food and Drug Administration (FDA) in 1994, and introduced as Luvox in the US. In India, it is available, among several other brands, as Uvox by Abbott. It was one of the first SSRI antidepressants to be launched, and is prescribed in many countries to patients with major depression. It was the first SSRI, a non-TCA drug, approved by the U.S. FDA specifically for the treatment of OCD. At the end of 1995, more than ten million patients worldwide had been treated with fluvoxamine. Fluvoxamine was the first SSRI to be registered for the treatment of obsessive compulsive disorder in children by the FDA in 1997. In Japan, fluvoxamine was the first SSRI to be approved for the treatment of depression in 1999 and was later in 2005 the first drug to be approved for the treatment of social anxiety disorder. Fluvoxamine was the first SSRI approved for clinical use in the United Kingdom. Manufacturers include BayPharma, Synthon, and Teva, among others.

== Research directions ==
A 2022 review concluded that according to low-certainty evidence, fluvoxamine may slightly decrease all-cause mortality by day 28 and potentially reduce the risk of hospitalization or death in outpatients with mild COVID-19. While early studies have suggested potential benefits for fluvoxamine as an anti-inflammatory agent and a possible impact on reducing cytokine storms, further studies did not confirm this expected benefit on COVID-19 patients. A cytokine storm refers to an excessive immune response characterized by a release of large amounts of pro-inflammatory cytokines.

In May 2022, based on a review of available scientific evidence, the U.S. Food and Drug Administration (FDA) did not issue an emergency use authorization covering the use of fluvoxamine to treat COVID-19, saying that, at the time, the data was not sufficient to conclude that fluvoxamine may be effective in treating non-hospitalized people with COVID-19 to prevent serious illness or hospitalization. The agency stated that the available study results were not conclusive on whether fluvoxamine is effective for this use.

Reviews published in 2024 indicate that clinical trials have shown fluvoxamine to be more effective than a placebo in reducing clinical deterioration and hospitalization in COVID-19 patients, particularly those taking 200 mg or more daily.

== Environment ==
Fluvoxamine is a common finding in waters near human settlement. Christensen et al. 2007 finds it is "very toxic to aquatic organisms" by European Union standards.
