= Clomacran =

Antipsychotic medication

Clinical data
- Trade names: Devryl, Olaxin, Develar
- ATC code: N05AX (WHO)

Legal status
- Legal status: BR: Class C1 (Other controlled substances); UK: Withdrawn

Identifiers
- IUPAC name: 3-(2-Chloro-9,10-dihydroacridin-9-yl)-N,N-dimethylpropan-1-amine
- CAS Number: 5310-55-4
- PubChem CID: 21382
- ChemSpider: 20095
- UNII: 5B1UZF65WW
- ChEBI: CHEBI:135273
- ChEMBL: ChEMBL1615350
- CompTox Dashboard (EPA): DTXSID20863518

Chemical and physical data
- Formula: C_{18}H_{21}ClN_{2}
- Molar mass: 300.83 g·mol^{−1}
- 3D model (JSmol): Interactive image
- Density: 1.120 g/cm^{3} g/cm^{3}
- SMILES: CN(C)CCCC1C2=CC=CC=C2NC3=C1C=C(C=C3)Cl
- InChI: InChI=1S/C18H21ClN2/c1-21(2)11-5-7-14-15-6-3-4-8-17(15)20-18-10-9-13(19)12-16(14)18/h3-4,6,8-10,12,14,20H,5,7,11H2,1-2H3; Key:JFRLWWDJCFYFSU-UHFFFAOYSA-N

Clomacran is an antipsychotic drug of the dihydroacridine class, developed in the 1970s by the pharmaceutical company Smith, Kline & French (now GlaxoSmithKline) under the brand names Devryl and Olaxin.

It was used to treat schizophrenia in the 1970s. It was withdrawn from the market in the UK, due to liver toxicity, in 1982.

== Synthesis ==
Clomacran can be synthesized beginning with 2-chloroacridone (1) which is reacted with a Grignard reagent derived from 3-chloro-N,N-dimethylpropylamine (2) to afford the tertiary carbinol (3). Dehydration by means of acid or simply heat gives the corresponding olefin (4). Catalytic reduction completes the synthesis of clomacran (5).

Synthesis of clomacran

== See also ==
- Chlorprothixene
