= Norclomipramine =

Chemical compound

Clinical data
- Other names: N-Desmethylcomipramine; Chlordesipramine; 3-Chlorodesipramine

Identifiers
- IUPAC name: 3-(2-Chloro-5,6-dihydrobenzo[b][1]benzazepin-11-yl)-N-methylpropan-1-amine
- CAS Number: 303-48-0
- PubChem CID: 622606
- ChemSpider: 540947
- UNII: 01DN47PPQG
- CompTox Dashboard (EPA): DTXSID70952663
- ECHA InfoCard: 100.164.655

Chemical and physical data
- Formula: C_{18}H_{21}ClN_{2}
- Molar mass: 300.83 g·mol^{−1}
- 3D model (JSmol): Interactive image
- SMILES: CNCCCN1C2=CC=CC=C2CCC3=C1C=C(C=C3)Cl
- InChI: InChI=1S/C18H21ClN2/c1-20-11-4-12-21-17-6-3-2-5-14(17)7-8-15-9-10-16(19)13-18(15)21/h2-3,5-6,9-10,13,20H,4,7-8,11-12H2,1H3; Key:VPIXQGUBUKFLRF-UHFFFAOYSA-N

Norclomipramine, also known as N-desmethylclomipramine and chlordesipramine, is the major active metabolite of the tricyclic antidepressant (TCA) clomipramine (Anafranil).
