= Tail chasing =

Behaviour exhibited in dogs

A four-year-old male German Shepherd chasing its tail

Tail chasing is a behaviour exhibited in dogs that is characterized by spinning in tight circles in either direction, and can be slow and focused on the tail or fast and unfocused. It is a compulsion similar to those seen in humans suffering from OCD and it can be quite disruptive to the lives of the dogs themselves, as well as their owners. Some causes have been suggested, including genetic factors, and environmental factors that vary depending on the individual dog. Furthermore, treatment options include drugs that decrease the frequency of tail chasing by targeting the underlying mechanisms, and behavioural changes regulated by the dog's owners.

== Problematic behaviour ==
It is common for problems to arise when dogs compulsively chase their tails. One case study described a dog who began to lose weight, demonstrated aggressive behaviour when its owner attempted to stop the chasing, and became uninterested in enjoyable daily activities, such as walks and eating. Another case study described a dog with similar symptoms but who also injured its tail and head while chasing its tail. Furthermore, with increased tail chasing behaviour, the injuries become more serious, such as fractures from the animals often banging into things while chasing their tails, getting skin abrasions and infections from creating open wounds on the tail, and abrasions on the pads of their feet. The most serious cases can result in amputation or even euthanasia if other treatments are unsuccessful. Surveys from owners suggest that tail chasing diminishes quality of life for the dog and usually interferes with the relationship between dog and owner.

== Parallels with human disorders ==
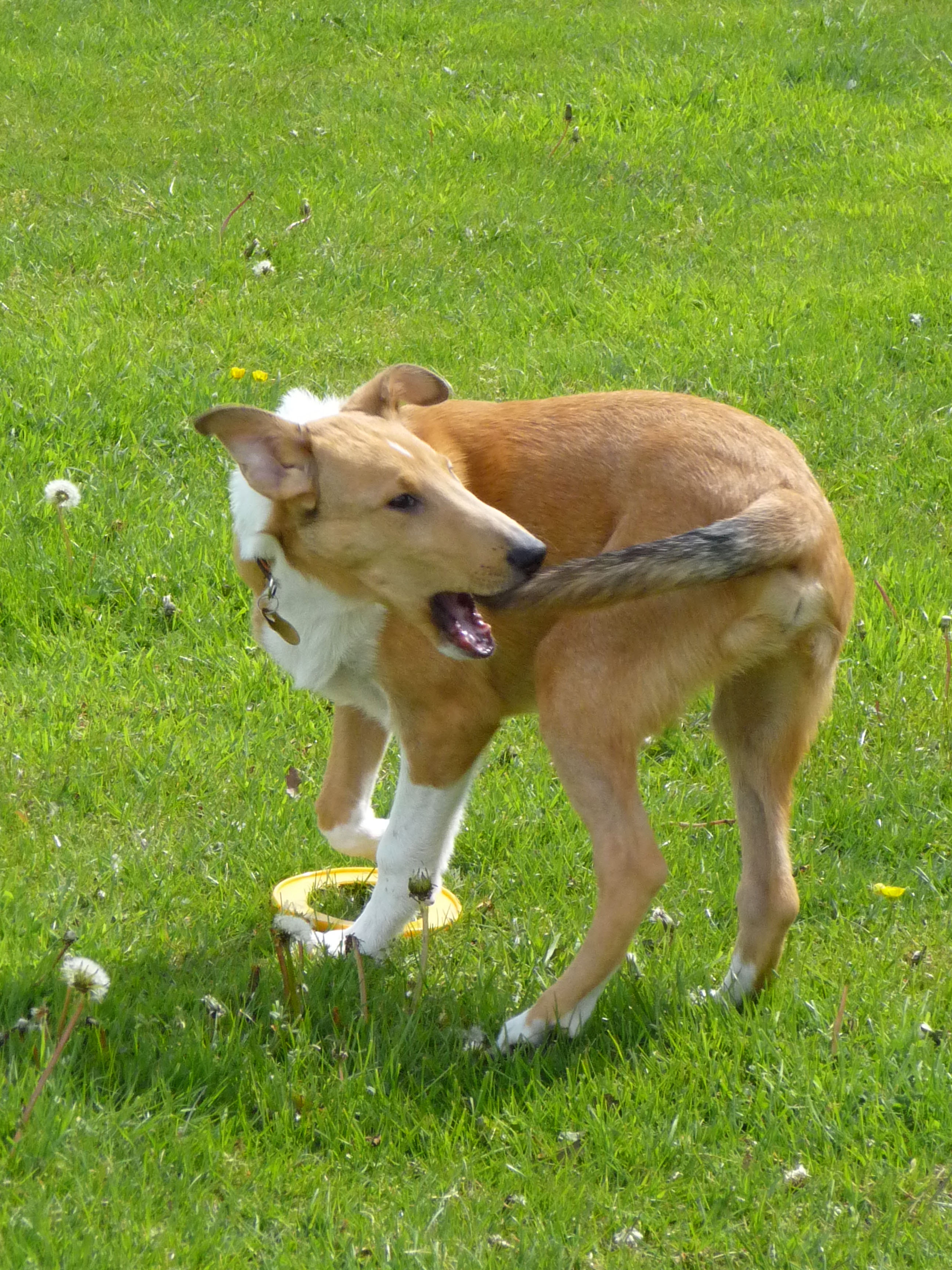
Dog chasing tail

=== OCD ===
Obsessive Compulsive Disorder (OCD) in humans is characterized by the onset of intrusive, repetitive thoughts and urges (obsessions), that are typically eased through a certain behaviour (compulsions). In addition, it can present early in life or later. One study also found that OCD has a high comorbidity with other disorders, such as generalized anxiety disorder (GAD). Dogs who chase their tails are often described as having Canine Compulsive Disorder (CD), as they seem to compulsively chase their tails, it has been described as appearing as early as two months old, and the behaviour can worsen or become more frequent when the animal is stressed.

=== ASD ===
Autism Spectrum Disorder (ASD) has also been known to develop early in life and a common symptom is repetitive behaviours. It has also been shown that most of the children with ASD were also hard to distract from any task they were focused on. Tail chasing has been compared to autism as it usually starts with random outbursts and then as the compulsion progresses, it becomes more frequent and more difficult to distract the dog from doing it. Bull Terriers who exhibit tail chasing have been found to have increased serum neurotensin and corticotropin-releasing hormone levels, an increase also seen in children with ASD. The same study found elevated noise sensitivity amongst the Bull Terriers who tail chased, which is a common sensitivity for people with ASD.

== Causes and treatments ==
=== Causes ===
Bull Terrier, one of the most common tail chasers

Tail chasing and other compulsive behaviours in dogs, such as fly snapping and blanket suckling, have been associated with breed, stressful situations, seizures, and possibly the CDH2 gene. Tail chasing behaviour is most common in Bull Terriers and German Shepherds, but can also be seen in other breeds, like Doberman Pinschers and Shiba Inus. A study in Japan found significant effect of breed on tail chasing, while another found bull terriers and German Shepherds had the earliest onset of the behaviour.

In regards to stressful situations, case studies have shown that common triggers for tail chasing are situations in which the dog is uncomfortable, such as meeting new people or anticipating a stressful event. Another study showed similar findings in that about 30% of owners reporting that stressful or frustrating situations triggered tail chasing.

Seizure activity has also been associated with tail chasing. A correlation between tail chasing and seizure activity was insignificant, but it was higher than the correlations between tail chasing and sex, trance-like behaviour, noises, and skin allergies, which are all also associated with tail chasing. Further, a case study showed seizure activity localized in the lateral hypothalamus or cerebellum as one of the diagnosing criteria in a dog who problematically chased its tail.

In terms of genetic contributions, there is some debate, as one finding suggests that all compulsive-type behaviours are linked to higher expression of the CDH2 gene, while another found no such correlation between gene and tail chasing behaviour.

Other potential causes have been suggested in addition to those listed above. One study suggests a possible influence of where the dog was bought (pet store or breeder), saying that dogs bought from pet stores were more likely to chase their tails, and they also suggested the possibility that being homed with other dogs may be a trigger. Another study found that tail chasing was more common in males than in females, suggesting a possible sex difference.

=== Treatments ===
Treatment for tail chasing is usually a combination of drug and behavioural therapy that is suited to the cause of tail chasing for the specific animal. Fluoxetine, an SSRI used to treat compulsive disorders, is a common drug used to treat CD and tail chasing. One study did find that hypericin was more effective at treating tail chasing than fluoxetine. Other drugs used to treat tail chasing include sedatives such as acepromazine, for those who are triggered by stressful or fearful situations, and anti-seizure medication such as gabapentin, for those who have seizures that could be increasing the behaviour.

Behavioural treatment for tail chasing mainly involves physically inhibiting the dog from completing the behaviour (e.g. with a muzzle) by preventive measures or interrupting the behaviour. It is also important to keep a regular daily routine that includes walks and regular feeding times, and playing, while avoiding potential stressors, such as loud noises and strangers. In addition, it is also common to gradually return the dog into potentially stressful situations in a controlled manner to habituate them to normal activities while preventing triggering an episode.
