= Acetoxymethylketobemidone =

Opioid designer drug

Identifiers
- IUPAC name: [3-(4-acetyl-1-methylpiperidin-4-yl)phenyl] acetate
- CAS Number: 878895-45-5
- PubChem CID: 155907596
- ChemSpider: 129433808
- UNII: 5M56JWT3CP
- CompTox Dashboard (EPA): DTXSID401342368

Chemical and physical data
- Formula: C_{16}H_{21}NO_{3}
- Molar mass: 275.348 g·mol^{−1}
- 3D model (JSmol): Interactive image
- SMILES: CC(=O)C1(CCN(CC1)C)C2=CC(=CC=C2)OC(=O)C
- InChI: InChI=1S/C16H21NO3/c1-12(18)16(7-9-17(3)10-8-16)14-5-4-6-15(11-14)20-13(2)19/h4-6,11H,7-10H2,1-3H3; Key:ZXPASXBVYVTLRG-UHFFFAOYSA-N

Acetoxymethylketobemidone (O-AMKD), is an opioid designer drug related to ketobemidone, with around the same potency as morphine. It was first identified in Germany in October 2020.

== See also ==
- 2F-Viminol
- 3-HO-PCP
- 4-Fluoropethidine
- Acetoxyketobemidone
- List of fentanyl analogues
- Dipyanone
- Etodesnitazene
- Methylketobemidone
- Nortilidine
- O-Desmethyltramadol
- Piperidylthiambutene
- Propylketobemidone
