= C22H29NO2 =

The molecular formula C_{22}H_{29}NO_{2} (molar mass: 339.471 g/mol) may refer to:

- A-834,735
- Dextropropoxyphene
- Levopropoxyphene
- Lobelanidine
- Noracymethadol
- N-Benzyl-N-desmethyltramadol
