= C18H21N =

The molecular formula C_{18}H_{21}N may refer to:

- Desoxypipradrol
- DPH-362
- Spasmolytic A29
