= CYP2D6 =

Human liver enzyme

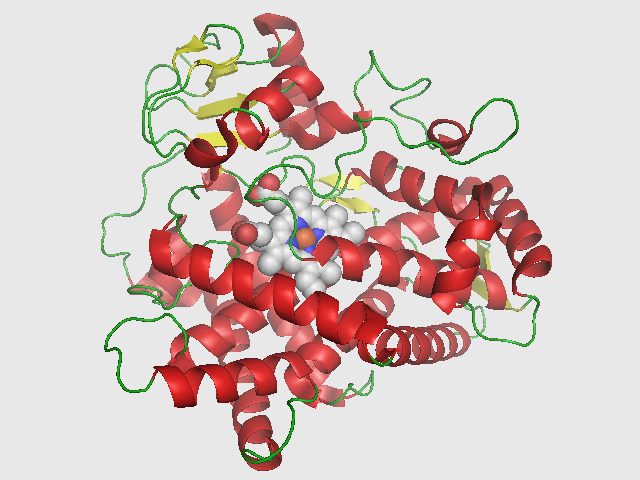

Identifiers
- Aliases: CYP2D6, CPD6, CYP2D, CYP2D7AP, CYP2D7BP, CYP2D7P2, CYP2D8P2, CYP2DL1, CYPIID6, P450-DB1, P450C2D, P450DB1, cytochrome P450 family 2 subfamily D member 6, Cytochrome P450 2D6
- External IDs: OMIM: 124030; MGI: 1929474; GeneCards: CYP2D6
Available structures
PDB	Ortholog search: PDBe RCSB
PDB	List of PDB id codes 2F9Q, 3QM4, 3TBG, 3TDA, 4WNT, 4WNU, 4WNV, 4WNW, 4XRY, 4XRZ

Gene location (Human)
Chr.	Chromosome 22 (human)
Band	22q13.2	Start	42,126,499 bp
Band	22q13.2	End	42,130,865 bp

Gene location (Mouse)
Chr.	Chromosome 15 (mouse)
Band	15|15 E1	Start	82,254,728 bp
Band	15|15 E1	End	82,264,461 bp
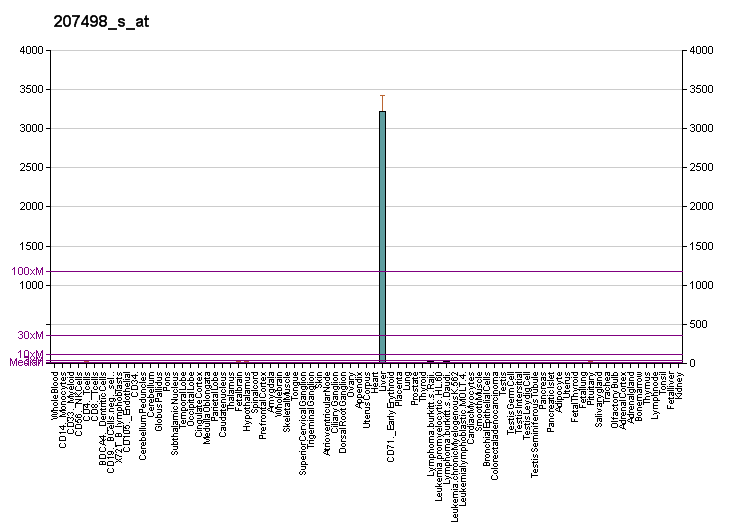

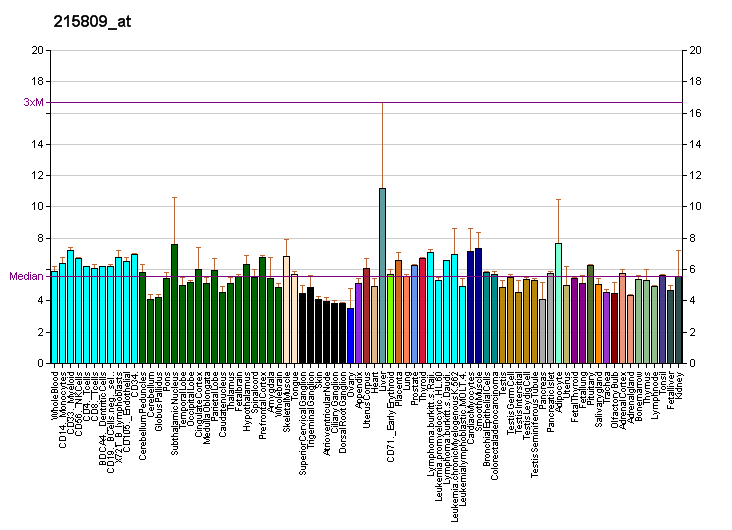
RNA expression pattern
Bgee	Human / Mouse (ortholog); Top expressed in: right lobe of liver; duodenum; sural nerve; right hemisphere of cerebellum; right uterine tube; pituitary gland; right lobe of thyroid gland; left lobe of thyroid gland; nucleus accumbens; anterior pituitary / Top expressed in: left lobe of liver; extraocular muscle; cerebellar cortex; sciatic nerve; lumbar subsegment of spinal cord; superior frontal gyrus; primary visual cortex; vestibular membrane of cochlear duct; neural layer of retina; muscle of thigh; More reference expression data
BioGPS	More reference expression data
Gene ontology
Molecular function	iron ion binding; metal ion binding; heme binding; oxidoreductase activity, acting on paired donors, with incorporation or reduction of molecular oxygen; oxidoreductase activity; aromatase activity; oxidoreductase activity, acting on paired donors, with incorporation or reduction of molecular oxygen, reduced flavin or flavoprotein as one donor, and incorporation of one atom of oxygen; steroid hydroxylase activity; monooxygenase activity
Cellular component	organelle membrane; endoplasmic reticulum membrane; membrane; intracellular membrane-bounded organelle; endoplasmic reticulum; mitochondrion; cytoplasm
Biological process	steroid metabolic process; alkaloid metabolic process; coumarin metabolic process; lipid metabolism; isoquinoline alkaloid metabolic process; alkaloid catabolic process; oxidative demethylation; heterocycle metabolic process; negative regulation of binding; monoterpenoid metabolic process; xenobiotic metabolic process; arachidonic acid metabolic process; negative regulation of cellular organofluorine metabolic process; long-chain fatty acid biosynthetic process; organic acid metabolic process
Sources:Amigo / QuickGO
Orthologs
Databases	NCBI: entry; OMA: entry
Species	Human	Mouse
Entrez	1565	56448
Ensembl	ENSG00000100197; ENSG00000275211; ENSG00000280905; ENSG00000282966; ENSG00000283284 ENSG00000272532	ENSMUSG00000061740
UniProt	P10635	Q9JKY7
RefSeq (mRNA)	NM_000106; NM_001025161	NM_001163472; NM_019823
RefSeq (protein)	NP_000097; NP_001020332	NP_001156944; NP_062797
Location (UCSC)	Chr 22: 42.13 – 42.13 Mb	Chr 15: 82.25 – 82.26 Mb
PubMed search
- Wikidata
View/Edit Human	View/Edit Mouse

Cytochrome P450 2D6 (CYP2D6) is an enzyme that in humans is encoded by the CYP2D6 gene. CYP2D6 is primarily expressed in the liver. It is also highly expressed in areas of the central nervous system, including the substantia nigra.

CYP2D6, a member of the cytochrome P450 mixed-function oxidase system, is one of the most important enzymes involved in the metabolism of xenobiotics in the body. In particular, CYP2D6 is responsible for the metabolism and elimination of approximately 25% of clinically used drugs, via the addition or removal of certain functional groups – specifically, hydroxylation, demethylation, and dealkylation. CYP2D6 also activates some prodrugs. This enzyme also metabolizes several endogenous substances, such as dimethyltryptamine, hydroxytryptamines, neurosteroids, and both m-tyramine and p-tyramine which CYP2D6 metabolizes into dopamine in the brain and liver.

Considerable variation exists in the efficiency and amount of CYP2D6 enzyme produced between individuals. Hence, for drugs that are metabolized by CYP2D6 (that is, drugs that are CYP2D6 substrates), certain individuals will eliminate these drugs quickly (ultrarapid metabolizers) while others slowly (poor metabolizers). If a drug is metabolized quickly, the drug's efficacy may decrease, while if a drug is metabolized too slowly, toxicity may result. The dose of the drug may have to be adjusted to take into account of the speed at which it is metabolized by CYP2D6. People who more rapidly metabolize prodrugs, such as codeine or tramadol, reach higher-than-therapeutic levels. A case study of the death of an infant breastfed by an ultrarapid metabolizer mother taking codeine impacted postnatal pain relief clinical practices, but was later debunked. These drugs may also cause serious toxicity in ultrarapid metabolizer patients when used to treat other post-operative pain, such as after tonsillectomy. Other drugs may be inhibitors of CYP2D6 activity or inducers of CYP2D6 enzyme expression that will lead to decreased or increased CYP2D6 activity respectively. If such a drug is taken at the same time as a second drug that is a CYP2D6 substrate, the first drug may affect the elimination rate of the second through what is known as a drug–drug interaction.

== Gene ==
The gene is located on chromosome 22q13.1. near two cytochrome P450 pseudogenes (CYP2D7P and CYP2D8P). Among them, CYP2D7P originated from CYP2D6 in a stem lineage of great apes and humans, the CYP2D8P originated from CYP2D6 in a stem lineage of Catarrhine and New World monkeys' stem lineage. Alternatively spliced transcript variants encoding different isoforms have been found for this gene.

== Genotype/phenotype variability ==
CYP2D6 is considered to show the largest phenotypical variability among the CYPs, largely due to genetic polymorphism. However, whether this difference is due to the focus on previous research and the ability of the methods to show variability or whether CYP2D6 actually varies more than the other genes is not yet fully understood. The genotype accounts for enhanced, normal, reduced, and non-existent CYP2D6 function in subjects. Pharmacogenomic tests are now available to identify patients with variations in the CYP2D6 allele and have been shown to have widespread use in clinical practice. The CYP2D6 function in any particular subject may be described as one of the following:

- poor metabolizer – little or no CYP2D6 function
- intermediate metabolizers – metabolize drugs at a rate somewhere between the poor and extensive metabolizers
- extensive metabolizer – normal CYP2D6 function
- ultrarapid metabolizer – multiple copies of the CYP2D6 gene are expressed, so greater-than-normal CYP2D6 function occurs

A patient's CYP2D6 phenotype is often clinically determined via the administration of debrisoquine (a selective CYP2D6 substrate) and subsequent plasma concentration assay of the debrisoquine metabolite (4-hydroxydebrisoquine).

The type of CYP2D6 function of an individual may influence the person's response to different doses of drugs that CYP2D6 metabolizes. The nature of the effect on the drug response depends both on the type of CYP2D6 function and on the extent to which processing of the drug by CYP2D6 results in a chemical that has an effect that is similar, stronger, or weaker than the original drug, or no effect at all. For example, if CYP2D6 converts a drug that has a strong effect into a substance that has a weaker effect, then poor metabolizers (weak CYP2D6 function) will have an exaggerated response to the drug and stronger side-effects; conversely, if CYP2D6 converts a different drug into a substance that has a greater effect than its parent chemical, then ultrarapid metabolizers (strong CYP2D6 function) will have an exaggerated response to the drug and stronger side-effects. Information about how human genetic variation of CYP2D6 affects response to medications can be found in databases such PharmGKB, Clinical Pharmacogenetics Implementation Consortium (CPIC).

== Genetic basis of variability ==
The variability in metabolism is due to multiple different polymorphisms of the CYP2D6 allele, located on chromosome 22. Subjects possessing certain allelic variants will show normal, decreased, or no CYP2D6 function, depending on the allele. Pharmacogenomic tests are now available to identify patients with variations in the CYP2D6 allele and have been shown to have widespread use in clinical practice. The current known alleles of CYP2D6 and their clinical function can be found in databases such as PharmVar.

== Ethnic factors in variability ==
Ethnicity is a factor in the occurrence of CYP2D6 variability. The reduction of the liver cytochrome CYP2D6 enzyme occurs approximately in 7–10% in white populations, and is lower in most other ethnic groups such as Asians and African Americans at 2% each. A complete lack of CYP2D6 enzyme activity, wherein the individual has two copies of the polymorphisms that result in no CYP2D6 activity at all, is said to be about 1-2% of the population. The occurrence of CYP2D6 ultrarapid metabolizers appears to be greater among Middle Eastern and North African populations. In Ethiopia, a particularly high percentage (30%) of the population are ultrametabolizers. As a result, the analgesic codeine is banned in Ethiopia due to the high rate of adverse events associated with ultrarapid metabolism of codeine in this population.

Caucasians with European descent predominantly (around 71%) have the functional group of CYP2D6 alleles, producing extensive metabolism, while functional alleles represent only around 50% of the allele frequency in populations of Asian descent.

This variability is accounted for by the differences in the prevalence of various CYP2D6 alleles among the populations–approximately 10% of whites are intermediate metabolizers, due to decreased CYP2D6 function, because they appear to have the one (heterozygous) non-functional CYP2D6*4 allele, while approximately 50% of Asians possess the decreased functioning CYP2D6*10 allele.

== Ligands ==
Following is a table of selected substrates, inducers and inhibitors of CYP2D6. Where classes of agents are listed, there may be exceptions within the class.

Inhibitors of CYP2D6 can be classified by their potency, such as:

- Strong inhibitor being one that causes at least a 5-fold increase in the plasma AUC values of sensitive substrates metabolized through CYP2D6, or more than 80% decrease in clearance thereof.
- Moderate inhibitor being one that causes at least a 2-fold increase in the plasma AUC values of sensitive substrates metabolized through CYP2D6, or 50-80% decrease in clearance thereof.
- Weak inhibitor being one that causes at least a 1.25-fold but less than 2-fold increase in the plasma AUC values of sensitive substrates metabolized through CYP2D6, or 20-50% decrease in clearance thereof.

Selected inducers, inhibitors and substrates of CYP2D6
Substrates ↑ = bioactivation by CYP2D6	Inhibitors	Inducers
All tricyclic antidepressants, e.g.; imipramine; amitriptyline; etc.; Most SSRIs (antidepressant), e.g.; fluoxetine; paroxetine; fluvoxamine; venlafaxine (SNRI antidepressant); duloxetine (SNRI, moderate sensitive substrates of CYP2D6); mianserin (tetracyclic antidepressant); mirtazapine (antidepressant); opioids; codeine ↑ [into morphine]; tramadol ↑ [into O-desmethyltramadol]; N-desmethyltramadol [inactive] ↑ [into N,O-didesmethyltramadol]; oxycodone ↑ [into oxymorphone]; hydrocodone ↑ [into hydromorphone]; tapentadol; antipsychotics, e.g.; clopixol; haloperidol; risperidone; perphenazine; thioridazine; zuclopenthixol; iloperidone; aripiprazole; chlorpromazine; levomepromazine; remoxipride; minaprine (RIMA antidepressant); tamoxifen ↑ [into hydroxytamoxifen] (SERM); beta-blockers; metoprolol; timolol; alprenolol; carvedilol; bufuralol; nebivolol; propranolol; debrisoquine (antihypertensive); Class I antiarrhythmics; flecainide; propafenone; encainide; mexiletine; lidocaine; sparteine; ondansetron (antiemetic); donepezil (acetylcholinesterase inhibitor); phenformin (antidiabetic); tropisetron (5-HT_{3} receptor antagonist); stimulants; amphetamine; dextroamphetamine (active metabolite of lisdexamfetamine); levoamphetamine; methamphetamine; dextromethamphetamine; levomethamphetamine; 3,4-methylenedioxyamphetamine; 3,4-methylenedioxymethamphetamine; NRI; atomoxetine; H_{3} receptor antagonist/inverse agonist; pitolisant; chlorphenamine (antihistamine); dexfenfluramine (serotonergic anorectic); dextromethorphan ↑ [into dextrorphan] (antitussive); metoclopramide (dopamine antagonist); perhexiline (antianginal agent); phenacetin (analgesic); promethazine (antihistamine antiemetic); m-tyramine; p-tyramine; Lysergic acid diethylamide (LSD); Dimethyltryptamine (DMT); 5-MeO-DMT; Calcium channel blocker; diltiazem (minor/moderate sensitive substrate); nifedipine (minor/moderate sensitive substrate)	Strong: Certain SSRIs; fluoxetine; paroxetine; bupropion (non-SSRI antidepressant); quinidine (class I antiarrhythmic agent); quinine; cinacalcet (calcimimetic); ritonavir (antiretroviral); cannabidiol; Moderate: duloxetine (SNRI); terbinafine (antifungal); Weak: amiodarone (antiarrhythmic); berberine (an alkaloid found in plants like berberis); buprenorphine (in opioid addiction); cimetidine (H2-receptor antagonist); citalopram (SSRI); escitalopram (SSRI); fluvoxamine (SSRI); methylphenidate; diltiazem; felodipine; mirtazapine; sertraline (SSRI); Unspecified potency: antipsychotics; haloperidol; perphenazine; thioridazine; zuclopenthixol; chlorpromazine; antihistamines (H_{1}-receptor antagonists); promethazine (antipsychotic); chlorphenamine; diphenhydramine; hydroxyzine; tripelennamine; celecoxib (NSAID); clemastine (antihistamine and anticholinergic); clomipramine (tricyclic antidepressant); cocaine (stimulant); doxepin (tricyclic antidepressant, anxiolytic); doxorubicin (chemotherapeutic); halofantrine (in malaria); hyperforin (St. Johns Wort); levomepromazine (antipsychotic); methadone (opioid and anti-addictive); metoclopramide (antiemetic, prokinetic); mibefradil (calcium channel blocker); midodrine (α_{1} agonist); moclobemide (antidepressant); niacin (nicotinic acid) and its form – niacinamide (nicotinamide), collectively called as vitamin B_{3}; sesame (seeds, oil); ticlopidine (antiplatelet)	Strong: glutethimide (hypnotic sedative); Unspecified potency: haloperidol (typical antipsychotic)

=== Dopamine biosynthesis ===
Biosynthetic pathways for catecholamines and trace amines in the human brain
In humans, catecholamines and phenethylaminergic trace amines are derived from the amino acid phenylalanine. It is well established that dopamine is produced from L-tyrosine via L-dopa; however, recent evidence has shown that CYP2D6 is expressed in the human brain and catalyzes the biosynthesis of dopamine from L-tyrosine via p-tyramine. Similarly, CYP2D6 also metabolizes m-tyramine into dopamine.
