= C16H17N =

The molecular formula C_{16}H_{17}N may refer to:

- 3,3-Diphenylcyclobutanamine
- BW247
