= N,O-Didesmethyltramadol =

Chemical compound

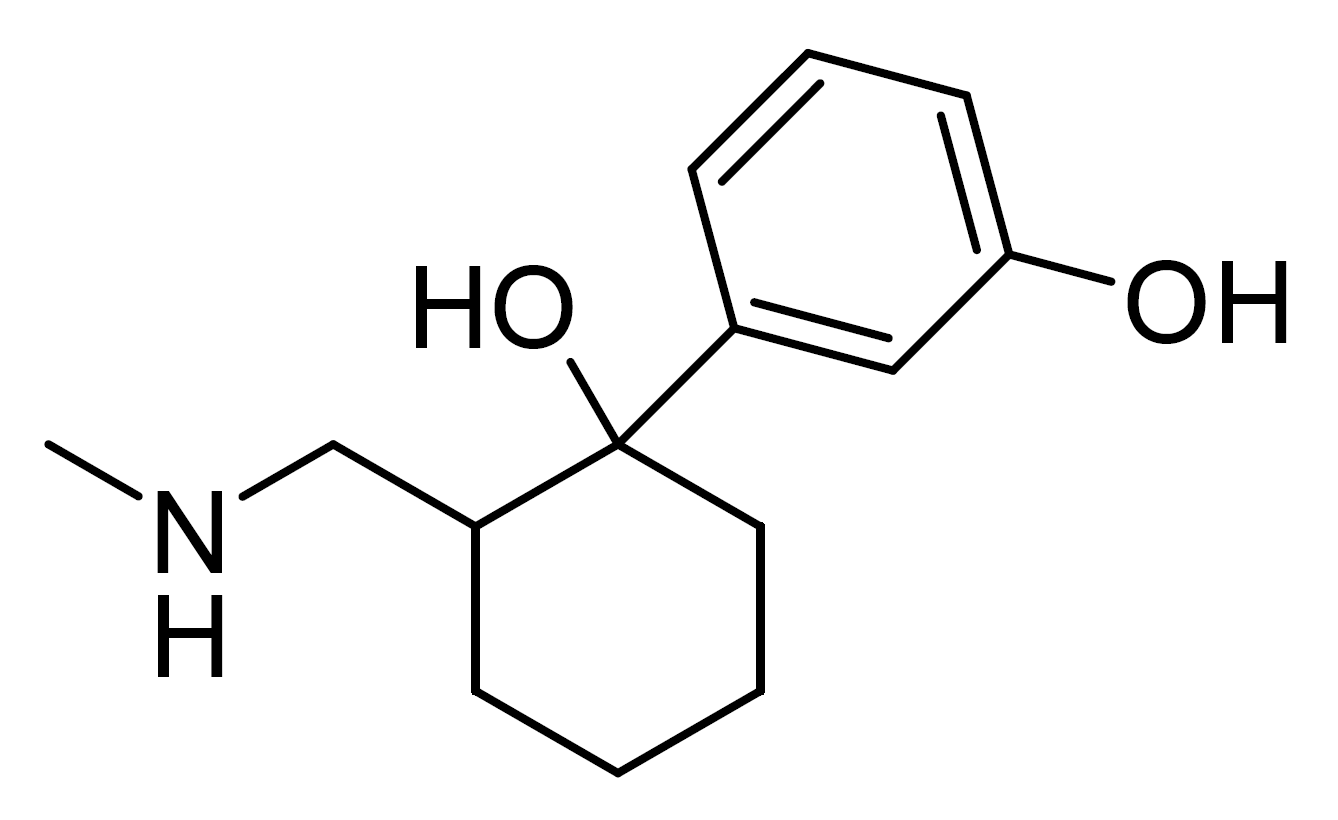

Identifiers
- IUPAC name: 3-[1-hydroxy-2-(methylaminomethyl)cyclohexyl]phenol
- CAS Number: 138853-73-3
- PubChem CID: 9816106
- ChemSpider: 7991856
- UNII: F6F6QC876T
- ChEBI: CHEBI:173687
- CompTox Dashboard (EPA): DTXSID90932422

Chemical and physical data
- Formula: C_{14}H_{21}NO_{2}
- Molar mass: 235.327 g·mol^{−1}
- 3D model (JSmol): Interactive image
- SMILES: CNCC1CCCCC1(C2=CC(=CC=C2)O)O
- InChI: InChI=1S/C14H21NO2/c1-15-10-12-5-2-3-8-14(12,17)11-6-4-7-13(16)9-11/h4,6-7,9,12,15-17H,2-3,5,8,10H2,1H3/t12-,14+/m1/s1; Key:CJXNQQLTDXASSR-OCCSQVGLSA-N

N,O-Didesmethyltramadol (tramadol metabolite M5) is an opioid derivative which is one of two active metabolites of the opioid analgesic medication tramadol. It is many times less potent than the other active metabolite O-Desmethyltramadol but is still more potent as a mu opioid receptor agonist than tramadol itself, unlike the other metabolites N-desmethyltramadol, N,N-didesmethyltramadol, and N,N,O-tridesmethyltramadol which are entirely without opioid activity. As with tramadol and O-desmethyltramadol it is found as a mixture of the (1S,2S)- and (1R,2R)-enantiomers, although the separate enantiomers of N,O-didesmethyltramadol have not been studied individually. It is specifically listed as a Schedule I drug in Canada, presumably due to concerns it may be subject to abuse as a designer drug in a similar manner to other opioid active metabolites such as O-desmethyltramadol and nortilidine.

== See also ==
- Bisnortilidine
- Dezocine
- Tapentadol
- 7-Hydroxymitragynine
