= C15H19NO2 =

The molecular formula C_{15}H_{19}NO_{2} (molar mass: 245.32 g/mol, exact mass: 245.1416 u) may refer to:

- Bisnortilidine
- Tasimelteon
- Tropacocaine, or benzoylpseudotropine
- G-N (drug)
