= C17H23NO3 =

The molecular formula C_{17}H_{23}NO_{3} may refer to:

- Acetoxyketobemidone
- Atropine
- Hyoscyamine
- Littorine
- MDPHP (3',4'-Methylenedioxy-α-pyrrolidinohexiophenone)
- Mesembrine
