= Spasmolytic A29 =

Antispasmodic drug

Clinical data
- Other names: N,N-Dimethyl-4,4-diphenylbut-3-en-2-amine

Identifiers
- CAS Number: 29869-90-7
- PubChem CID: 122535
- ChemSpider: 109252
- UNII: A6FGC19UYP

Chemical and physical data
- Formula: C_{18}H_{21}N
- Molar mass: 251.373 g·mol^{−1}
- 3D model (JSmol): Interactive image
- SMILES: CC(C=C(C1=CC=CC=C1)C2=CC=CC=C2)N(C)C

A29 is a spasmolytic drug. It not used by itself but is co-administered with ketobemidone in a formulation sold as Ketogan. It is an analog of both amitriptyline and diphenhydramine.

== See also ==
- BW247
- DPH-362
