= Tilidine =

Synthetic opioid painkiller

- (1S,2R)-tilidine (dextilidine; top), (1R,2S)-tilidine (bottom) [skeletal diagram 2D]

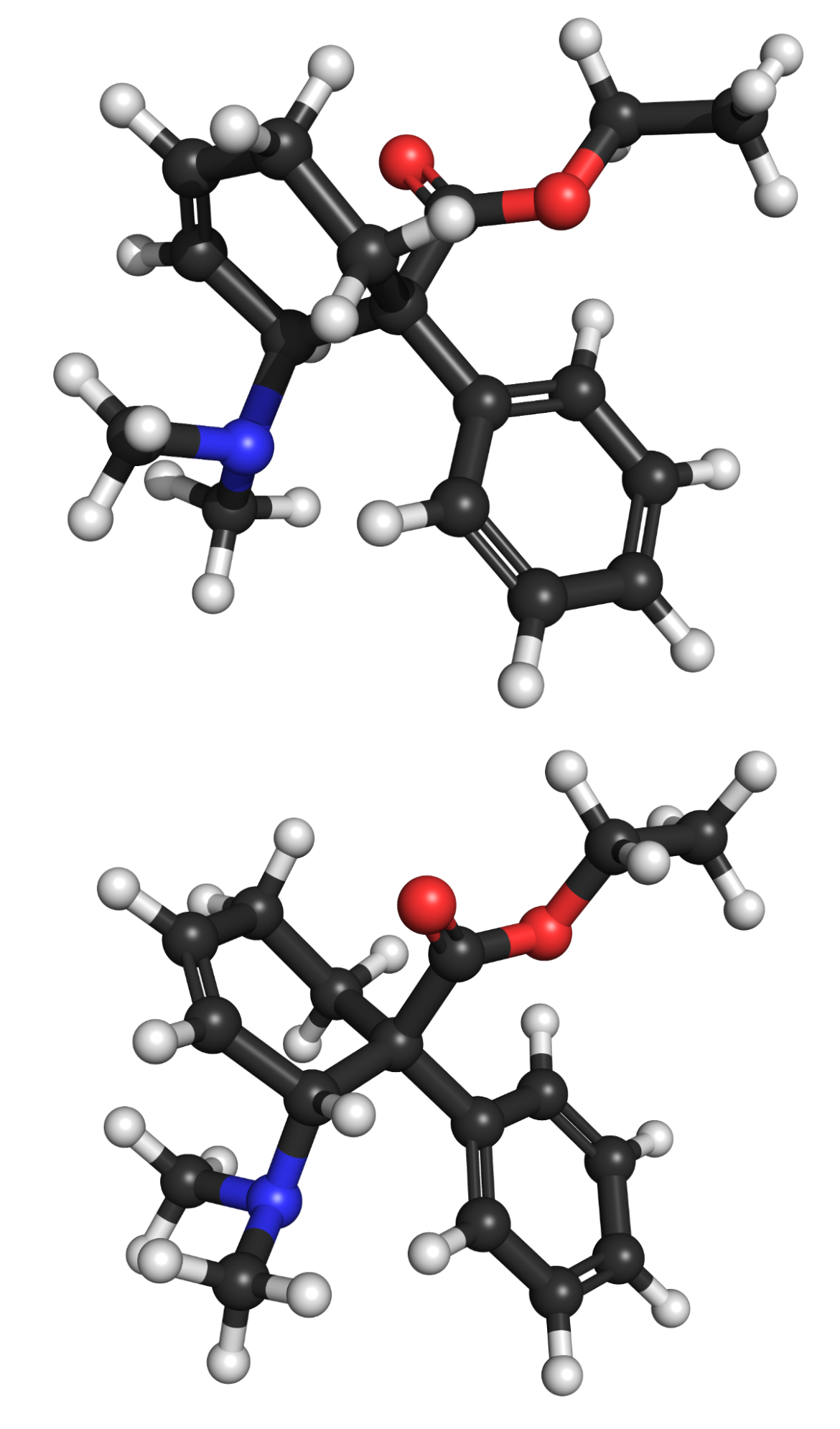
- (1S,2R)-tilidine (dextilidine; top), (1R,2S)-tilidine (bottom) [ball-and-stick diagram 3D]

Clinical data
- Trade names: Valoron, others
- Other names: Tilidate (BAN UK)
- AHFS/Drugs.com: International Drug Names
- Routes of administration: By mouth, rectal, intramuscular, intravenous
- Drug class: Opioid
- ATC code: N02AX01 (WHO)

Legal status
- Legal status: AU: S8 (Controlled drug); BR: Class A1 (Narcotic drugs); CA: Schedule I; DE: Prescription only (Anlage III for higher doses) if combined with naloxone; US: Schedule I

Pharmacokinetic data
- Bioavailability: 6% (parent compound), 99% (active metabolite)
- Metabolism: Metabolized by the liver, mostly via the enzymes CYP3A4 and CYP2C19
- Onset of action: 10–15 minutes
- Elimination half-life: 3–5 hours
- Duration of action: 4–6 hours
- Excretion: Urine (90%)

Identifiers
- IUPAC name: Ethyl (1R,2S)-rel-2-(dimethylamino)-1-phenylcyclohex-3-ene-1-carboxylate
- CAS Number: 51931-66-9
- PubChem CID: 30131
- DrugBank: DB13787
- UNII: GY33N31E9Y
- KEGG: D08597
- ChEBI: CHEBI:77823
- ChEMBL: ChEMBL563449
- ECHA InfoCard: 100.039.779

Chemical and physical data
- Formula: C_{17}H_{23}NO_{2}
- Molar mass: 273.376 g·mol^{−1}
- 3D model (JSmol): Interactive image
- SMILES: O=C(OCC)[C@@]1(CCC=C[C@H]1N(C)C)C2=CC=CC=C2

Tilidine, sold under the brand-name Valoron among others, is a synthetic opioid analgesic, used mainly in Belgium, Bulgaria, Germany, Albania, Luxembourg, and South Africa for the treatment of moderate to severe pain, both acute and chronic. Its onset of pain relief after oral administration is about 10-15 minutes and peak relief from pain occurs about 25-50 minutes after administration.

== Medical uses ==
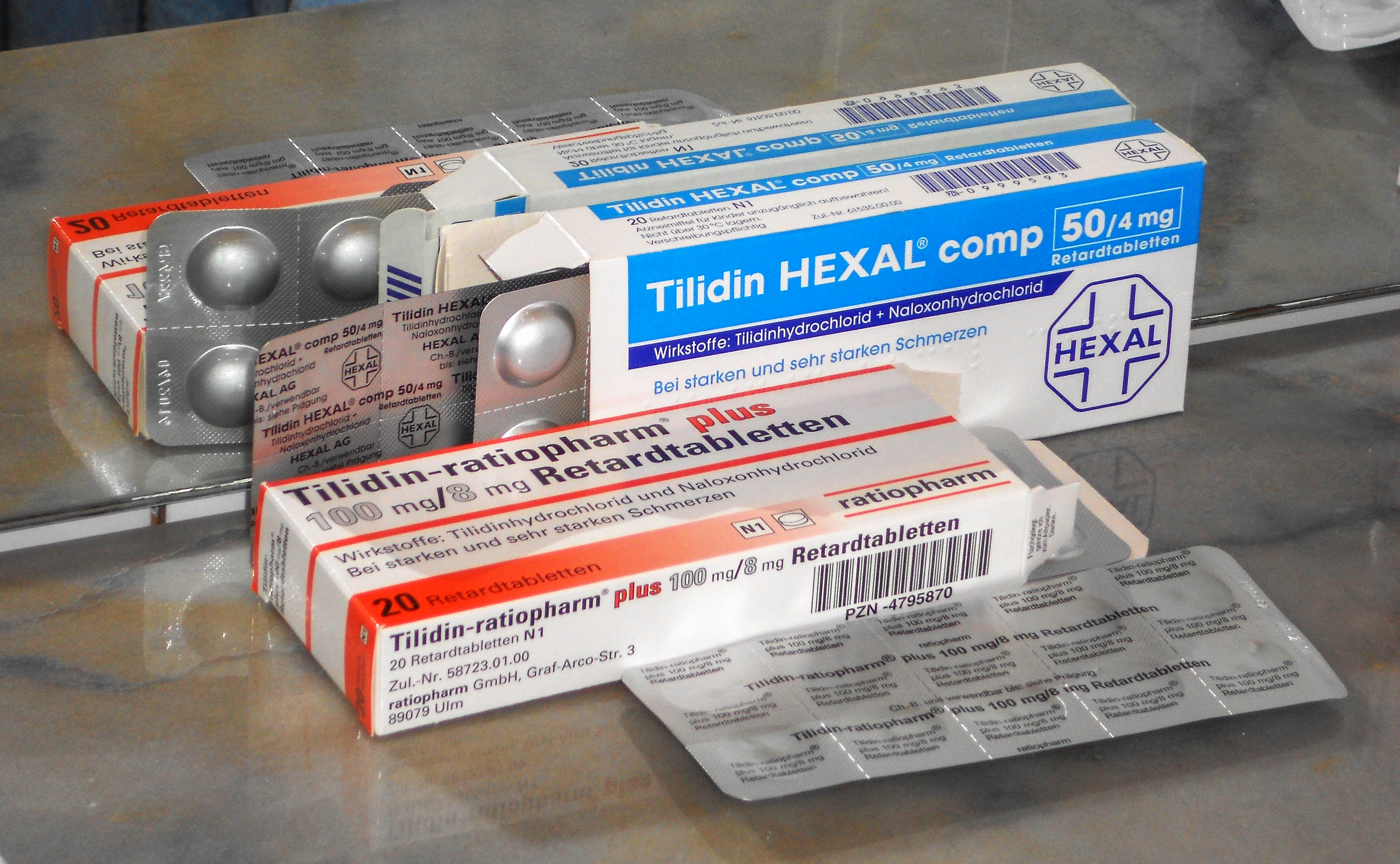
Tilidine

Tilidine is used in the form of hydrochloride or phosphate salt. In Germany, tilidine is available in a fixed combination with naloxone for oral administration (Valoron N and generics); the mixture of naloxone is claimed to lower the abuse liability of the opioid analgesic. This is so that if people take the medication orally (which is the way they are meant to) the opioid blocker, naloxone, has minimal effects on them but if they inject it the naloxone becomes bioavailable and hence antagonizes the effects of the tilidine producing withdrawal effects. In Switzerland the original Valoron brand with only tilidine and no naloxone is also available.

As well as its use as an analgesic, tilidine is also commonly used in Germany for treatment of restless legs syndrome. The reverse ester is also known and is also a prodrug.

Tilidine explicitly without Naloxone is a controlled substance in most countries, listed in the German BtMG, Austrian SMG, and in the USA under the Controlled Substances Act as ACSCN 9750 as a Narcotic under Schedule I, with an annual aggregate manufacturing quota of 10 grams in 2014. It is used as the hydrochloride (free base conversion ratio 0.882) and HCl hemihydrate (0.858).

== Adverse effects ==
Its most common adverse effects are transient nausea and vomiting, dizziness, drowsiness, fatigue, headache, and nervousness; less commonly, nausea and vomiting (after repeated dosing), hallucinations, confusion, euphoria, tremor, hyperreflexia, clonus, and increased sweating. Uncommonly, somnolence; rarely, diarrhoea and abdominal pain.

== Physicochemistry ==
It usually comes in its hydrochloride hemihydrate salt-form; in this form it is highly-soluble in water, ethanol, and dichloromethane and appears as a white/almost white crystalline powder. Its storage is restricted by its sensitivity to degradation by light and oxygen, hence necessitating its storage in amber bottles and at temperatures below 30 degrees Celsius, respectively.

== Pharmacology ==
Considered a low-to-medium-potency opioid, tilidine has the oral potency of about 0.2, that is, a dose of 100mg p.o. is equianalgesic to approximately 20mg morphine sulfate orally. It is administered orally (by mouth), rectally (by a suppository), or by injection (SC, IM, or slowly IV).

Tilidine itself is only a weak opioid, but is rapidly metabolized in the liver and gut to its active metabolite nortilidine and then to bisnortilidine. It is the (1S,2R)-isomer (dextilidine) that is responsible for its analgesic activity. Nortilidine binds to opiate receptors in the central and peripheral nervous systems and suppresses pain perception and transmission.

To purportedly counteract the abuse potential, tilidine is used in combination with the opioid receptor antagonist naloxone. The mixing ratio with naloxone is chosen so that the analgesic effect of tilidine is not impaired.

== Pharmacokinetics ==
Tilidine is rapidly-absorbed after oral administration and is subject to a pronounced first-pass effect.

The conversion of tilidine into the more active metabolite nortilidine occurs with the participation of CYP3A4 and CYP2C19. The inhibition of these enzymes can thus alter the efficacy and tolerability profile of tilidine. The analgesic effect occurs after 10-15 minutes. After oral administration of 100mg tilidine plus 8mg naloxone, the maximum effect is reached in about 25-50 minutes. The duration of action is given as 4-6 hours.

The elimination half-life for nortilidine is 3-5 hours. Tilidine is metabolized to 90% and eliminated renally. The rest appears in the feces.

Depending on the extent of the impairment, the maximum concentration of nortilidine in plasma is lower in insufficient liver function than in healthy individuals and the half-life is prolonged. In case of severe hepatic insufficiency the therapy is questionable. In these cases, it is possible that the formation of active nortilidine may be so low that the analgesic effect is insufficient. In addition, in the combination preparations with naloxone, the inactivation of the same can only be insufficient. The consequent antagonism of nortilidine’s effect can lead to a further loss of activity.

== Synthesis ==
Thieme Synthesis: Patents:

The condensation between Crotonaldehyde (1) and dimethylamine (2) give dimethylaminobutadiene [139943-10-5] (3). The Diels-Alder reaction with ethyl atropate [22286-82-4] (4) yields a mixture of isomers, of which only the (E)-(trans)-isomers are active.

The separation from the mixture by precipitation of the inactive (Z)-(cis)-isomers as zinc complex. The inactive (Z)-(cis)-isomers may be epimerized to the more thermodynamically favored (E)-(trans)-isomers via reflux in diluted phosphoric acid.
