= Bufuralol =

Names
- Preferred IUPAC name 2-(tert-Butylamino)-1-(7-ethyl-1-benzofuran-2-yl)ethan-1-ol
- Other names 2-(tert-Butylamino)-1-(7-ethylbenzofuran-2-yl)ethan-1-ol; 2-(tert-Butylamino)-1-(7-ethyl-1-benzofuran-2-yl)ethanol

Identifiers
CAS Number	54340-62-4
3D model (JSmol)	Interactive image
ChEMBL	ChEMBL296035
ChemSpider	64777
ECHA InfoCard	100.053.720
PubChem CID	71733
UNII	891H89GFT4
CompTox Dashboard (EPA)	DTXSID30866414
- InChI: InChI=1S/C16H23NO2/c1-5-11-7-6-8-12-9-14(19-15(11)12)13(18)10-17-16(2,3)4/h6-9,13,17-18H,5,10H2,1-4H3
- SMILES: OC(c2oc1c(cccc1c2)CC)CNC(C)(C)C

Properties
Chemical formula	C_{16}H_{23}NO_{2}
Molar mass	261.365 g·mol^{−1}
- Except where otherwise noted, data are given for materials in their standard state (at 25 °C [77 °F], 100 kPa). Infobox references

Bufuralol is a potent beta-adrenoceptor antagonist with partial agonist activity. It is metabolized by CYP2D6.

Most beta blockers are aryloxypropanolamine-based. In this rare exception, the benzofuran oxygen is part of a ring rather than derived from the epichlorohydrin precursor.
