= BW247 =

Noradrenaline antidepressant

BW 247

Identifiers
- CAS Number: 21912-88-9
- PubChem CID: 89549
- ChemSpider: 80819

Chemical and physical data
- Formula: C_{16}H_{17}N
- Molar mass: 223.319 g·mol^{−1}
- 3D model (JSmol): Interactive image
- SMILES: CNCC=C(C1=CC=CC=C1)C2=CC=CC=C2

BW-247 is an antidepressant. BW-247 is a secondary amine, closely related in structure to the tricyclic antidepressants, which inhibits NA uptake in aortic strips and rat cerebral cortex slices. Unlike the tricyclic antidepressants, it is reported not to possess anticholinergic activity.

== See also ==
- Spasmolytic A29
- DPH-362
