= Desmetramadol =

Opioid analgesic

Clinical data
- Other names: O-Desmethyltramadol; O-DSMT; Omnitram

Legal status
- Legal status: DE: NpSG (Industrial and scientific use only); UK: Class B

Pharmacokinetic data
- Metabolism: CYP3A4 and CYP2B6
- Elimination half-life: 6–8 hours

Identifiers
- IUPAC name: 3-(2-((dimethylamino)methyl)-1-hydroxycyclohexyl)phenol
- CAS Number: 73986-53-5
- PubChem CID: 130829
- ChemSpider: 115703
- UNII: 2WA8F50C3F
- ChEMBL: ChEMBL1400
- CompTox Dashboard (EPA): DTXSID40894102

Chemical and physical data
- Formula: C_{15}H_{23}NO_{2}
- Molar mass: 249.354 g·mol^{−1}
- 3D model (JSmol): Interactive image
- SMILES: OC2(c1cc(O)ccc1)CCCCC2CN(C)C
- InChI: InChI=1S/C15H23NO2/c1-16(2)11-13-6-3-4-9-15(13,18)12-7-5-8-14(17)10-12/h5,7-8,10,13,17-18H,3-4,6,9,11H2,1-2H3; Key:UWJUQVWARXYRCG-UHFFFAOYSA-N

Desmetramadol (INN), also known as O-desmethyltramadol (O-DSMT), is an opioid analgesic and the main active metabolite of tramadol. Tramadol is demethylated by the liver enzyme CYP2D6 to desmetramadol in the same way as codeine, and so similarly to the variation in effects seen with codeine, individuals who have a less active form of CYP2D6 will tend to have reduced analgesic effects from tramadol. Because desmetramadol itself does not need to be metabolized to induce an analgesic effect, it can be used in individuals with CYP2D6 inactivating mutations.

Desmetramadol is commonly encountered as a designer drug online in powder form or as an ingredient in pressed pills due to being unscheduled in many jurisdictions. Outside of its role as a metabolite, a chemical used in research, and as a recreational drug, desmetramadol has a very limited history of human usage and is not approved for medicinal use in any country as of 2025.

== Pharmacology ==
=== Pharmacodynamics ===
(+)-Desmetramadol is a G-protein biased μ-opioid receptor full agonist. It shows comparatively far lower affinity for the δ- and κ-opioid receptors. The two enantiomers of desmetramadol show quite distinct pharmacological profiles; both (+) and (−)-desmetramadol are inactive as serotonin reuptake inhibitors, but (−)-desmetramadol retains activity as a norepinephrine reuptake inhibitor, and so the mix of both the parent compound and metabolites contributes significantly to the complex pharmacological profile of tramadol. While the multiple receptor targets can be beneficial in the treatment of pain (especially complex pain syndromes such as neuropathic pain), they increase the potential for drug interactions compared to other opioids, and may also contribute to side effects. Desmetramadol is also an antagonist of the serotonin 5-HT_{2C} receptor, at pharmacologically relevant concentrations, via competitive inhibition. This suggests that the apparent anti-depressant properties of tramadol may be at least partially mediated by desmetramadol, thus prolonging the duration of therapeutic benefit. Inhibition of the 5-HT_{2C} receptor is a suggested factor in the mechanism of anti-depressant effects of agomelatine and maprotiline. The potential selectivity and favorable side effect profile of desmetramadol compared to tramadol, makes it more suitable for use as antidepressant, although clinical development appears to have stopped. Upon inhibition of the receptor, downstream signaling causes dopamine and norepinephrine release, and the receptor is thought to significantly regulate mood, anxiety, feeding, and reproductive behavior. 5-HT_{2C} receptors regulate dopamine release in the striatum, prefrontal cortex, nucleus accumbens, hippocampus, hypothalamus, and amygdala, among others. Research indicates that some suicide victims have an abnormally high number of 5-HT_{2C} receptors in the prefrontal cortex. There is some mixed evidence that agomelatine, a 5-HT_{2C} antagonist, is an effective antidepressant. Antagonism of 5-HT_{2C} receptors by agomelatine results in an increase of dopamine and norepinephrine activity in the frontal cortex.

=== Pharmacokinetics ===
==== Metabolites ====
Desmetramadol is metabolized in the liver into the active metabolite N,O-didesmethyltramadol via CYP3A4 and CYP2B6. The inactive tramadol metabolite N-desmethyltramadol is metabolized into the active metabolite N,O-didesmethyltramadol by CYP2D6.

== Society and culture ==
=== Recreational use ===
A herbal remedy called Krypton was found to contain kratom leaf powder and desmetramadol. Krypton was reportedly linked to at least 9 accidental opioid overdose deaths in Sweden during 2010–2011.

=== Legality ===
==== United Kingdom ====
Desmetramadol was made a Class B drug in the United Kingdom on 26 February 2013.

==== United States of America ====
The U.S. Drug Enforcement Administration issued a temporary order for the classification of desmetramadol in schedule 1 of the Controlled Substances Act for the period of August 12, 2026 through August 12, 2028.

==== Germany ====
Desmetramadol was banned under the NpSG 2025.

== See also ==
- 7-Hydroxymitragynine
- List of investigational analgesics
- N-Benzyl-N-desmethyltramadol
- Nortilidine
- O-AMKD
- Tapentadol
- TLR4
