= N-Benzyl-N-desmethyltramadol =

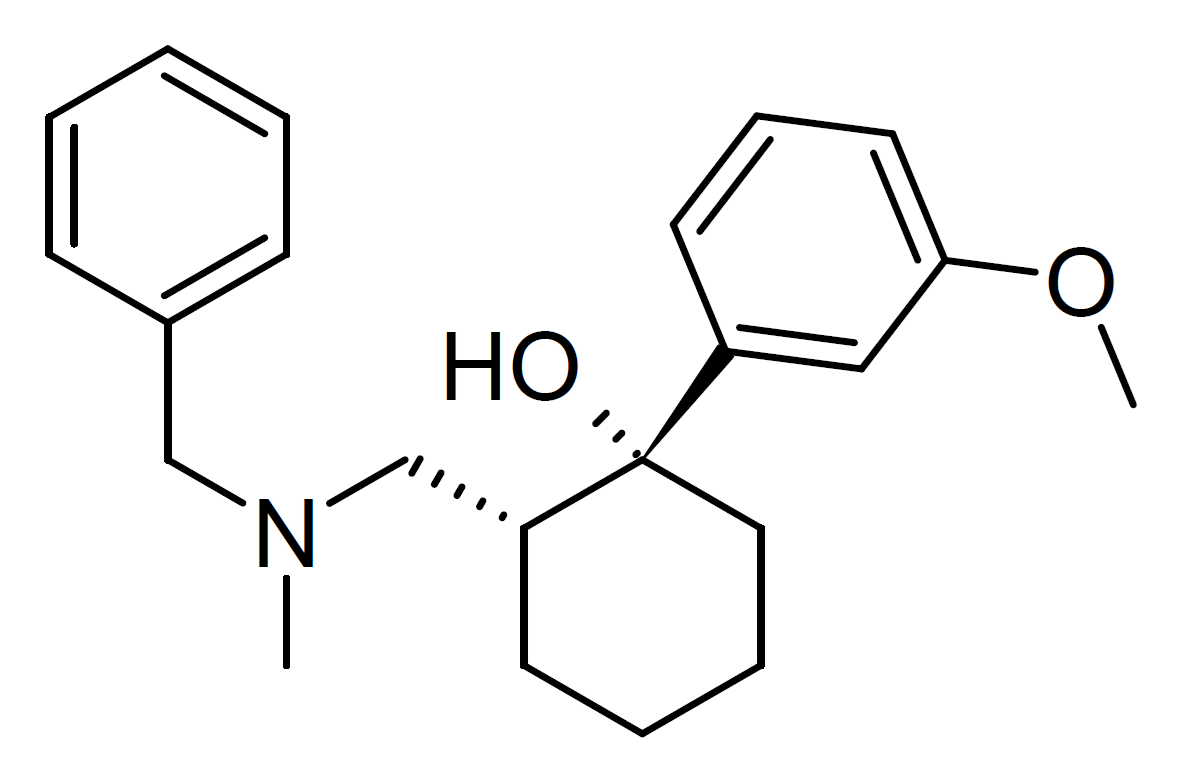

Identifiers
- IUPAC name: (1R,2R)-2-[[benzyl(methyl)amino]methyl]-1-(3-methoxyphenyl)cyclohexan-1-ol
- CAS Number: 1346601-74-8
- PubChem CID: 29973424
- ChemSpider: 68026258
- CompTox Dashboard (EPA): DTXSID70994826

Chemical and physical data
- Formula: C_{22}H_{29}NO_{2}
- Molar mass: 339.479 g·mol^{−1}
- 3D model (JSmol): Interactive image
- SMILES: CN(C[C@H]1CCCC[C@@]1(C2=CC(=CC=C2)OC)O)CC3=CC=CC=C3
- InChI: InChI=1S/C22H29NO2/c1-23(16-18-9-4-3-5-10-18)17-20-11-6-7-14-22(20,24)19-12-8-13-21(15-19)25-2/h3-5,8-10,12-13,15,20,24H,6-7,11,14,16-17H2,1-2H3/t20-,22+/m1/s1; Key:BDLHYNRDCFWMAA-IRLDBZIGSA-N

N-Benzyl-N-desmethyltramadol is an opioid analgesic drug related to tramadol which has been sold as a designer drug. It is commonly sold as the deuterated derivative RBTd3, though the non-deuterated parent compound has similar activity.

== See also ==
- O-Desmethyltramadol
