= Levopropoxyphene =

Names
- Preferred IUPAC name (2R,3S)-4-(Dimethylamino)-3-methyl-1,2-diphenylbutan-2-yl propanoate

Identifiers
CAS Number	2338-37-6
3D model (JSmol)	Interactive image; Interactive image
ChEMBL	ChEMBL1213351
ChemSpider	21234163
PubChem CID	200742
UNII	U75VZ9PK1J
CompTox Dashboard (EPA)	DTXSID8023212
- InChI: InChI=1S/C22H29NO2/c1-5-21(24)25-22(18(2)17-23(3)4,20-14-10-7-11-15-20)16-19-12-8-6-9-13-19/h6-15,18H,5,16-17H2,1-4H3 Key: XLMALTXPSGQGBX-UHFFFAOYSA-N; InChI=1/C22H29NO2/c1-5-21(24)25-22(18(2)17-23(3)4,20-14-10-7-11-15-20)16-19-12-8-6-9-13-19/h6-15,18H,5,16-17H2,1-4H3/t18-,22-/m1/s1 Key: XLMALTXPSGQGBX-XMSQKQJNBJ
- SMILES: CCC(=O)OC(Cc1ccccc1)(c2ccccc2)C(C)CN(C)C; O=C(O[C@](c1ccccc1)(Cc2ccccc2)[C@@H](C)CN(C)C)CC

Properties
Chemical formula	C_{22}H_{29}NO_{2}
Molar mass	339.471
- Except where otherwise noted, data are given for materials in their standard state (at 25 °C [77 °F], 100 kPa). verify (what is ?) Infobox references

Levopropoxyphene is an antitussive. It is an optical isomer of dextropropoxyphene. The racemic mixture is called propoxyphene. Only the dextro-isomer (dextropropoxyphene) has an analgesic effect; the levo-isomer appears to exert only an antitussive effect. It was formerly marketed in the U.S. by Eli Lilly under the tradename Novrad (a reversal of Darvon) as an antitussive. Unlike many antitussives, it binds poorly to the sigma-1 receptor.

== Synthesis ==
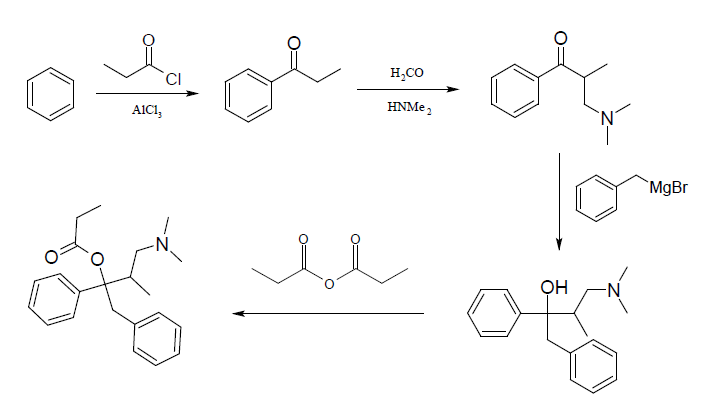
Propoxyphene synthesis

1. Friedel-Crafts acylation of benzene with propionyl chloride and aluminium chloride as a Lewis acid.
2. Mannich reaction of propiophenone with formaldehyde and dimethylamine affords the corresponding aminoketone.
3. Reaction of the ketone with benzylmagnesium bromide gives the amino alcohol. It is of note that this intermediate fails to show analgesic activity in animal assays.
4. Esterification of the alcohol by means of propionic anhydride affords the propionate.

=== Chirality ===
The presence of two chiral centers in this molecule means that the compound can exist as any of four isomers. The biologic activity has been found to be associated with the α-isomer. Resolution of that isomer into its optical antipodes showed the d isomer to be the active analgesic; this is now denoted as propoxyphene. The l isomer is almost devoid of analgesic activity; the compound does, however, show useful antitussive activity and is named levopropoxyphene.

== See also ==
- Dextropropoxyphene
