= Activation =

Concept in chemistry and biology

In chemistry and biology, activation is the process whereby something is prepared or excited for a subsequent reaction.

== Chemistry ==
In chemistry, "activation" refers to the reversible transition of a molecule into a nearly identical chemical or physical state, with the defining characteristic being that this resultant state exhibits an increased propensity to undergo a specified chemical reaction. Thus, activation is conceptually the opposite of protection, in which the resulting state exhibits a decreased propensity to undergo a certain reaction.

The energy of activation specifies the amount of free energy the reactants must possess (in addition to their rest energy) in order to initiate their conversion into corresponding products—that is, in order to reach the transition state for the reaction. The energy needed for activation can be quite small, and often it is provided by the natural random thermal fluctuations of the molecules themselves (i.e. without any external sources of energy).

The branch of chemistry that deals with this topic is called chemical kinetics.

== Biology ==
=== Biochemistry ===
In biochemistry, activation, specifically called bioactivation, is where enzymes or other biologically active molecules acquire the ability to perform their biological function, such as inactive zymogens (proenzymes) being converted into active enzymes that are able to catalyze their substrates' reactions into products. Bioactivation may also refer to the process where inactive prodrugs are converted into their active metabolites, or the toxication of protoxins into actual toxins. Additionally, certain enzymes or peptides undergo bioactivation through proteolytic cleavage.

An enzyme may be reversibly or irreversibly bioactivated. A major mechanism of irreversible bioactivation is where a piece of a protein is cut off by cleavage, producing an enzyme that will then stay active. A major mechanism of reversible bioactivation is substrate presentation where an enzyme translocates near its substrate. Another reversible reaction is where a cofactor binds to an enzyme, which then remains active while the cofactor is bound, and stops being active when the cofactor is removed.

In protein synthesis, amino acids are carried by transfer RNA (tRNA) molecules and added to a growing polypeptide chain on the ribosome. In order to transfer the amino acids to the ribosome, tRNAs must first be covalently bonded to the amino acid through their 3' CCA terminal. This binding is catalyzed by aminoacyl-tRNA synthetase (aaRS), and requires a molecule of ATP. The amino acid bound to the tRNA is called an aminoacyl-tRNA, and is considered the activated molecule in protein translation. Once activated, the aminoacyl-tRNA may move to the ribosome and add the amino acid to the growing polypeptide chain.

=== Immunology ===
In immunology, activation is the transition of leucocytes and other cell types involved in the immune system. On the other hand, deactivation is the transition in the reverse direction. This balance is tightly regulated, since a too small degree of activation causes susceptibility to infections, while, on the other hand, a too large degree of activation causes autoimmune diseases.

Activation and deactivation results from a variety of factors, including cytokines, soluble receptors, arachidonic acid metabolites, steroids, receptor antagonists, adhesion molecules, bacterial products and viral products.

== Electrophysiology ==
Activation refers to the opening of ion channels, i.e. the conformational change in the protein structure that allows ions to pass through ion channels. This change allows specific ions (Na⁺, K⁺, Ca²⁺, or Cl⁻) to pass through the various channels according to their unique electrochemical gradients. The opening of ion channels are triggered by stimuli such as changes in membrane voltage (voltage-gated channels), ligand binding (ligand-gated channels), mechanical forces (mechanosensitive channels), or intracellular signaling molecules. The dysregulation of ion channels may lead to various channelopathies (epilepsy, long QT syndrome, cystic fibrosis).
