= Bisnortilidine =

Names
- Preferred IUPAC name Ethyl (1R,2S)-2-amino[1,1′-bi(cyclohexane)]-1′,3,3′,5′-tetraene-1-carboxylate

Identifiers
| CAS Number | 53948-51-9 |
| 3D model (JSmol) | Interactive image |
| ChemSpider | 454879 |
| PubChem CID | 162740 |
| UNII | 58NDD17NUF |
| CompTox Dashboard (EPA) | DTXSID00968752 |
- InChI: InChI=1S/C15H19NO2/c1-2-18-14(17)15(11-7-6-10-13(15)16)12-8-4-3-5-9-12/h3-6,8-10,13H,2,7,11,16H2,1H3/t13-,15+/m0/s1 Key: BTKAMSWFNMGLGM-DZGCQCFKSA-N
- SMILES: CCOC(=O)[C@]1(CCC=C[C@@H]1N)C2=CC=CC=C2

Properties
| Chemical formula | C_{15}H_{19}NO_{2} |
| Molar mass | 245.322 g·mol^{−1} |
- Except where otherwise noted, data are given for materials in their standard state (at 25 °C [77 °F], 100 kPa). Infobox references

Bisnortilidine is an opioid metabolite. It is formed from tilidine by demethylation in the liver.
