= DPH-362 =

Simplified chemical analog of amitriptyline

Clinical data
- Other names: PD129167

Identifiers
- IUPAC name: N,N-dimethyl-4,4-diphenylbut-3-en-1-amine
- CAS Number: 28916-83-8
- PubChem CID: 13465
- ChemSpider: 12888

Chemical and physical data
- Formula: C_{18}H_{21}N
- Molar mass: 251.373 g·mol^{−1}
- 3D model (JSmol): Interactive image
- SMILES: CN(C)CCC=C(C1=CC=CC=C1)C2=CC=CC=C2
- InChI: InChI=InChI=1S/C18H21N/c1-19(2)15-9-14-18(16-10-5-3-6-11-16)17-12-7-4-8-13-17/h3-8,10-14H,9,15H2,1-2H3; Key:ZRPJJBLGKLVADE-UHFFFAOYSA-N

DPH-362 is a simplified amitriptyline analog created by omission of the two-carbon dibenzosuberane bridge (the seven membered ring). The resulting compound still had activity in a test to explore TCA sodium channel blockers with analgesic properties.

It is based on previous structures such as Spasmolytic A29 (one of the active ingredients in Ketogan) and SKF-89976A.

== See also ==
- Amitriptyline
- γ-Butyrolactone
