= Ketobemidone =

Chemical compound

Clinical data
- Trade names: Ketogan
- Other names: Ketobemidone, Cliradon, Cymidon, Ketogan, Ketorax
- AHFS/Drugs.com: International Drug Names
- Routes of administration: By mouth, rectal, intravenous
- ATC code: N02AB01 (WHO)

Legal status
- Legal status: AU: S9 (Prohibited substance); BR: Class F1 (Prohibited narcotics); CA: Schedule I; DE: Anlage II (Authorized trade only, not prescriptible); US: Schedule I; EU: Rx-only

Pharmacokinetic data
- Bioavailability: 34~40% (oral), 44% (rectal)
- Elimination half-life: 2–4 hours
- Duration of action: 3–5 hours

Identifiers
- IUPAC name: 1-[4-(3-Hydroxyphenyl)-1-methyl-4-piperidyl]propan-1-one
- CAS Number: 469-79-4
- PubChem CID: 10101
- DrugBank: DB06738
- ChemSpider: 9697
- UNII: PQS1L514CF
- KEGG: D08100
- ChEMBL: ChEMBL47072
- CompTox Dashboard (EPA): DTXSID00196977
- ECHA InfoCard: 100.006.748

Chemical and physical data
- Formula: C_{15}H_{21}NO_{2}
- Molar mass: 247.338 g·mol^{−1}
- 3D model (JSmol): Interactive image
- SMILES: O=C(CC)C1(CCN(C)CC1)c2cc(O)ccc2
- InChI: InChI=1S/C15H21NO2/c1-3-14(18)15(7-9-16(2)10-8-15)12-5-4-6-13(17)11-12/h4-6,11,17H,3,7-10H2,1-2H3; Key:ALFGKMXHOUSVAD-UHFFFAOYSA-N

Ketobemidone, sold under the brand name Ketogan (a mixture of ketobemidone and Spasmolytic A29) among others, is a powerful synthetic opioid painkiller. Its effectiveness against pain is in the same range as morphine, and it also has some NMDA-antagonist properties imparted, in part, by its metabolite norketobemidone. This may make it useful for some types of pain that do not respond well to other opioids. It is marketed in Denmark, Iceland, Norway. Until 2024 it was available in, but is now withdrawn in Sweden. It is used for severe pain.

== History ==
Ketobemidone was first synthesized in 1942 by Eisleb and colleagues, at the laboratory of I.G. Farbenindustrie at Hoechst during the Second World War. The first study of it in humans was published in 1946, and it was introduced in clinical medicine shortly after. It was not in clinical use in the United States when the Controlled Substances Act 1970 was promulgated and was assigned to Schedule I with an ACSCN of 9628. As of 2013, no annual manufacturing quota was assigned by the DEA.

Pfizer manufactures ketobemidone under the tradenames Ketogan and Ketorax. It is available as tablets, suppositories, and injection fluid. A sustained release formulation, sold as Ketodur, exists in some countries and contains 10 or 25 mg ketobemidone.

== Pharmacology ==
Experiments on former addicts indicated it was quite addictive and in high doses, compared to other opioids, may have increased abuse potential in former and current opioid addicts. While some effort was first suggested for drafting of a resolution urging governments to stop manufacture and use of ketobemidone, this result was not in agreement with clinical observations, and another study in 1958 did not find it more addictive than morphine. That study noticed that while for morphine the dose for euphoria is the same as that for analgesia, for ketobemidone the analgesic dose was well below the euphoric dose. Thus, even compared to morphine, ketobemidone may be much more effective without causing significant euphoria and thus having a lower risk of addiction under the supervision of a qualified clinician. Ketobemidone is mostly used in the Scandinavian countries, with Denmark topping the statistics.

Analgesia after 5-10 mg orally or 5–7.5 mg intravenously lasts 3–5 hours. Ketobemidone is also available in preparations with a spasmolytic, which can improve the analgesia.

== Metabolism ==
Ketobemidone is mainly metabolized by conjugation of the phenolic hydroxyl group, and by N-demethylation. Only about 13-24% is excreted unchanged after intravenous administration.

== Chemistry ==
Ketobemidone is 1-methyl-4-(3-hydroxyphenyl)-4-propionylpiperidine. It is usually available as the hydrochloride, which is a white powder. It is synthesized by alkylating (3-methoxyphenyl)acetonitrile with bis(2-chloroethyl)methylamine, followed by reaction with ethylmagnesium bromide, and finally O-demethylation with hydrobromic acid.

Because of a strong vesicant nature of bis(2-chloroethyl)methylamine there are many other routes developed for obtaining ketobemidone. A route depicted below lays through first alkylating the same (3-methoxyphenyl)acetonitrile with 2-chloro-N,N-dimethylethylamine or 2-chloro-N-benzyl-N-methylethylamine. Next, those amines are alkylated once again using a mixed 1-bromo-2-chloroethane, thus completing the piperidine ring and obtaining a quaternary ammonium salt, which can be dequaternized using thiophenol salt (for N,N-dimethylammonium) or catalytic hydrogenation (for both compounds) to a common 4-(3-methoxyphenyl)-4-cyano-1-methyl-pyperidine. The latter yields ketobemidone after Grignard reaction with ethylmagnesium bromide and ether cleavage.

== See also ==
- Acetoxyketobemidone
- Acetoxymethylketobemidone (O-AMKD)
- Dextropropoxyphene
- Pethidine
- Methadone
- Methylketobemidone
- Tramadol
- Phenadoxone
- Propylketobemidone
- Dextromoramide
- Picenadol
- Levorphanol
