= Acetoxyketobemidone =

Opioid analgesic drug

Clinical data
- Other names: Acetoxyketobemidone, O-Acetylketobemidone
- ATC code: none

Identifiers
- IUPAC name: 1-[4-(3-acetoxyphenyl)-1-methylpiperidin-4-yl]propan-1-one
- CAS Number: 107419-07-8
- ChemSpider: 10441717
- UNII: 9VD2KUA9ZF
- CompTox Dashboard (EPA): DTXSID50632370

Chemical and physical data
- Formula: C_{17}H_{23}NO_{3}
- Molar mass: 289.375 g·mol^{−1}
- 3D model (JSmol): Interactive image
- SMILES: O=C(CC)C1(CCN(C)CC1)c2cccc(OC(C)=O)c2
- InChI: InChI=1S/C17H23NO3/c1-4-16(20)17(8-10-18(3)11-9-17)14-6-5-7-15(12-14)21-13(2)19/h5-7,12H,4,8-11H2,1-3H3; Key:UHZAKWBTNFQWFQ-UHFFFAOYSA-N

Acetoxyketobemidone (O-Acetylketobemidone) is an opioid analgesic that is an acetylated derivative of ketobemidone. It was developed in the 1950s during research into analogues of pethidine and was assessed by the United Nations Office on Drugs and Crime but was not included on the list of drugs under international control, probably because it was not used in medicine or widely available. Nevertheless, acetoxyketobemidone is controlled as an ester of ketobemidone, which is included in Schedule I of the Single Convention on Narcotic Drugs of 1961.

Presumably acetoxyketobemidone produces similar effects to ketobemidone and other opioids, such as analgesia and sedation, along with side effects such as nausea, itching, vomiting and respiratory depression which may be harmful or fatal.
