= Nortilidine =

Chemical compound

Identifiers
- IUPAC name: ethyl (1R,2S)-2-(methylamino)-1-phenylcyclohex-3-ene-1-carboxylate
- CAS Number: 38677-94-0
- PubChem CID: 162321
- ChemSpider: 142535
- UNII: 7145G6817J
- ChEBI: CHEBI:77839
- ChEMBL: ChEMBL1614654
- CompTox Dashboard (EPA): DTXSID10191256

Chemical and physical data
- Formula: C_{16}H_{21}NO_{2}
- Molar mass: 259.349 g·mol^{−1}
- 3D model (JSmol): Interactive image
- SMILES: CCOC(=O)[C@]1(CCC=C[C@@H]1NC)C2=CC=CC=C2
- InChI: InChI=1S/C16H21NO2/c1-3-19-15(18)16(13-9-5-4-6-10-13)12-8-7-11-14(16)17-2/h4-7,9-11,14,17H,3,8,12H2,1-2H3/t14-,16+/m0/s1; Key:PDJZPNKVLDWEKI-GOEBONIOSA-N

Nortilidine is the major active metabolite of tilidine. It is formed from tilidine by demethylation in the liver. The racemate has opioid analgesic effects roughly equivalent in potency to that of morphine. The (1R,2S)-isomer has NMDA antagonist activity. The drug also acts as a dopamine reuptake inhibitor. The reversed-ester of nortilidine is also known, as is the corresponding analogue with the cyclohexene ring replaced by cyclopentane, which have almost identical properties to nortilidine.

== Use ==
Nortilidine has been sold as a designer drug, first being identified in Poland in May 2020.

== See also ==
- Desmetramadol, another opioid metabolite with additional (non-opioid) mechanisms of analgesia, which has also been sold as a designer drug
- Tapentadol
