= C12H18N2 =

The molecular formula C_{12}H_{18}N_{2} (molar mass: 190.29 g/mol, exact mass: 190.1470 u) may refer to:

- 2,3-Dihydro-DMT
- 2,3-Dimethylphenylpiperazine
- Methylbenzylpiperazine (MBZP), or 1-methyl-4-benzylpiperazine
- 3-Methylbenzylpiperazine (3-Me-BZP)
