= Party pills =

Type of recreational drugs

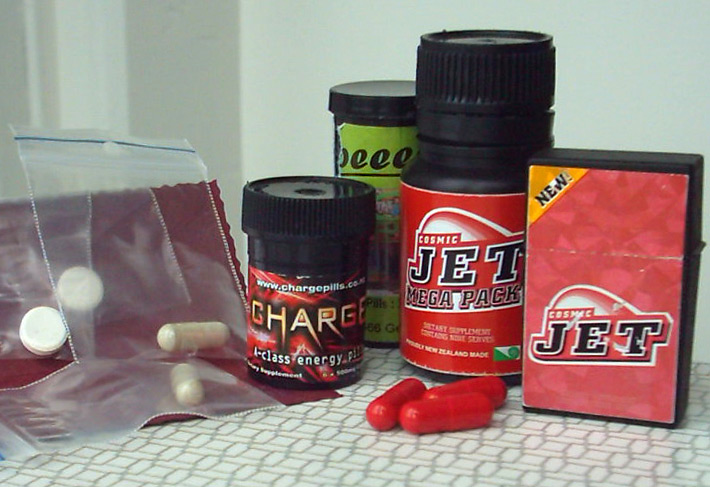
- A selection of products containing benzylpiperazine (BZP)

Clinical data
- Routes of administration: Oral

Legal status
- Legal status: AU: S9 (Prohibited substance); DE: Anlage II (Authorized trade only, not prescriptible); NZ: Class C; UK: POM (Prescription only); US: Schedule I

Party pills, also known as "herbal highs", "pep pills" "dance pills" and "natural power", is a colloquialism for a type of recreational drug whose main ingredient was originally benzylpiperazine (BZP), but has expanded to a wide range of compounds with a variety of effects. BZP is banned in several countries, including the United States, Republic of Ireland, Australia and New Zealand, but is available on a more or less restricted basis in many jurisdictions. A range of other piperazine derivatives have also been sold as ingredients in party pills, and many of these branded "proprietary blends" have subsequently been sold in countries around the world.

Piperazine derivatives sold in this way include BZP, TFMPP, MeOPP, pFPP and several others. mCPP has rarely been sold as a party pill ingredient due to its tendency to cause migraine headaches. These piperazines are usually mixed with other ingredients such as caffeine, 5-HTP, Oxedrine (which has close effects to ephedrine), Camellia sinensis (tea) and a range of vitamins, minerals, amino acids and binders to make party pills.

In countries such as New Zealand where BZP and related piperazines have been made illegal, there is now increasing commercial interest in piperazine-free "party pills" which are purported to produce similar effects with ingredients that will circumvent the ban. Common active ingredients (among many others) include caffeine, theobromine, other stimulant alkaloids, octopamine, blue lotus extract (Nymphaea caerulea), natural sources of the LSD precursor and weak psychedelic agent lysergic acid amide (illegal in many countries), passionflower (sedative which contains monoamine oxidase inhibitors), Citrus aurantium (contains small amounts of the stimulant synephrine), glaucine (plant derived compound usually used as cough medicine), and geranamine (alkylamine compound found in geranium oil).

== News and legality ==
Party pills and their legal status are often in the news. Matt Bowden, one of the original distributors of such pills was interviewed when issues involving party pills arose in the media. A clinical trial by ClubStargate for a pill named Ease was suspended because it contained methylone, which was claimed by the Ministry of Health to fall under New Zealand controlled drug analogue laws (although this was never proven in court).

New Zealand has classified BZP-based party pills as a "Restricted Substance" by the Misuse of Drugs Act and restricted to those over 18 years. For more on the legal issues posed by party pills, see benzylpiperazine.

In late June 2007, BZP was classed as a Class C drug in New Zealand and its availability was banned by a law passed on 13 March 2008, with a six-month amnesty period. It was not long before BZP-free alternatives appeared. Despite this, the ingredients used in the new products lacked the potency of the BZP based pills. This subsequently led to a decline in the popularity of party pills.

== See also ==
- Club drug
- Designer drug
- Drug abuse
- Ecstasy (drug)
- Methylhexanamine
- Recreational drug use
- Spice (drug)
