= Chlorophenylpiperazine =

Chlorophenylpiperazine may refer to:

- meta-Chlorophenylpiperazine
- ortho-Chlorophenylpiperazine
- para-Chlorophenylpiperazine
