= C11H13F3N2 =

The molecular formula C_{11}H_{13}F_{3}N_{2} (molar mass: 230.23 g/mol, exact mass: 230.1031 u) may refer to:

- Trifluoromethylphenylpiperazine
- 1-(4-(Trifluoromethyl)phenyl)piperazine
