= C10H13ClN2 =

The molecular formula C_{10}H_{13}ClN_{2} may refer to:

- Chlordimeform
- meta-Chlorophenylpiperazine
- para-Chlorophenylpiperazine
