= Para-Methoxyphenylpiperazine =

Chemical compound

pMeOPP

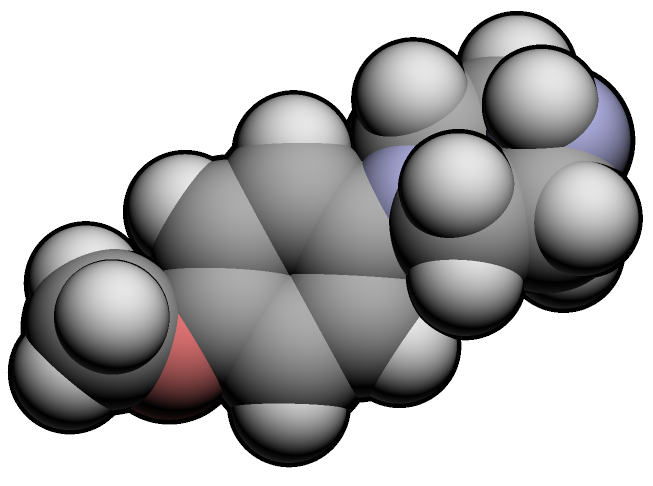

Clinical data
- Other names: pMeOPP; pMPP; p-MeOPP; p-MPP; 4-MeOPP; 4-MPP; MeOPP; MPP; Paraperazine
- Routes of administration: Oral
- ATC code: None

Legal status
- Legal status: DE: NpSG (Industrial and scientific use only); NZ: Class C

Pharmacokinetic data
- Metabolism: The human liver P450 CYP2D6 converts para-methoxyphenylpiperazine by demethylation to para-hydroxyphenylpiperazine.
- Excretion: Renal

Identifiers
- IUPAC name: 1-(4-methoxyphenyl)piperazine
- CAS Number: 38212-30-5
- PubChem CID: 269722
- ChemSpider: 237180
- UNII: P385M92GYG
- CompTox Dashboard (EPA): DTXSID30191591
- ECHA InfoCard: 100.048.918

Chemical and physical data
- Formula: C_{11}H_{16}N_{2}O
- Molar mass: 192.262 g·mol^{−1}
- 3D model (JSmol): Interactive image
- SMILES: C1=CC(=CC=C1N2CCNCC2)OC
- InChI: InChI=1S/C11H16N2O/c1-14-11-4-2-10(3-5-11)13-8-6-12-7-9-13/h2-5,12H,6-9H2,1H3; Key:MRDGZSKYFPGAKP-UHFFFAOYSA-N

para-Methoxyphenylpiperazine (pMeOPP), also known as 4-methoxyphenylpiperazine (4-MeOPP), is a substituted piperazine derivative with stimulant effects which has been sold as an ingredient in "Party pills", initially in New Zealand and subsequently in other countries around the world.

== Use and effects ==
pMeOPP is anecdotally said to induce significantly less anxiety than similar piperazines, and is usually taken at doses between 120–200 mg. However it is often mixed with stimulant piperazine derivatives such as benzylpiperazine (BZP) for a combined effect.

== Pharmacology ==
=== Pharmacodynamics ===
pMeOPP has been found in vitro to inhibit the reuptake and induce the release of the monoamine neurotransmitters. This is a mechanism of action shared with drugs of abuse such as amphetamines, and pMeOPP produces somewhat similar effects although it is much less potent and is thought to have relatively insignificant abuse potential. Piperazine derivatives such as trifluoromethylphenylpiperazine (TFMPP) have also been shown to exert a major part of their mechanism of action as nonselective serotonin receptor agonists, and pMeOPP has also been demonstrated to act in this way.

== Society and culture ==
=== Legal status ===
==== Finland ====
Scheduled in the "government decree on psychoactive substances banned from the consumer market".

==== New Zealand ====
Based on the recommendation of the EACD, the New Zealand government has passed legislation which placed BZP, along with a number of other piperazine derivatives into Class C of the New Zealand Misuse of Drugs Act 1975. A ban was intended to come into effect in New Zealand on December 18, 2007, but the law change did not go through until the following year, and the sale of BZP and the other listed piperazines became illegal in New Zealand as of 1 April 2008. An amnesty for possession and usage of these drugs remained until October 2008, at which point they became completely illegal.

==== United States ====
pMeOPP is not scheduled at the federal level in the United States.

===== Florida =====
"Methoxyphenylpiperazine" is a Schedule I controlled substance in the state of Florida making it illegal to buy, sell, or possess in Florida.

== See also ==
- Substituted piperazine
