= 2,3-Dimethylphenylpiperazine =

Clinical data
- Other names: 2,3-DMPP; 2,3-XP; PAL-218; PAL218
- Drug class: Partial serotonin–norepinephrine releasing agent

Identifiers
- IUPAC name: 1-(2,3-dimethylphenyl)piperazine
- CAS Number: 1013-22-5
- PubChem CID: 70541
- ChemSpider: 63712
- UNII: 4J6RHZ6CSA
- ChEMBL: ChEMBL2335161
- CompTox Dashboard (EPA): DTXSID60143826
- ECHA InfoCard: 100.012.540

Chemical and physical data
- Formula: C_{12}H_{18}N_{2}
- Molar mass: 190.290 g·mol^{−1}
- 3D model (JSmol): Interactive image
- SMILES: CC1=C(C(=CC=C1)N2CCNCC2)C
- InChI: InChI=1S/C12H18N2/c1-10-4-3-5-12(11(10)2)14-8-6-13-7-9-14/h3-5,13H,6-9H2,1-2H3; Key:LIKXJDINUMWKQA-UHFFFAOYSA-N

2,3-Dimethylphenylpiperazine (2,3-DMPP; code name PAL-218) is a monoamine releasing agent and designer drug of the phenylpiperazine family. It acts as a partial serotonin–norepinephrine releasing agent (SNRA), with EC_{50} (E_{max}) values of 24 to 26 nM (85%) for serotonin, 13.7 to 56 nM (62%) for norepinephrine, and 1,207 to 1,320 nM (66%) for dopamine (22–96-fold lower than serotonin and norepinephrine). Its possible activities at serotonin receptors were not reported. The drug was first described in the scientific literature by 2009.

== See also ==
- para-Nitrophenylpiperazine (pNPP; PAL-175)
- 3-Trifluoromethyl-4-chlorophenylpiperazine (TFMCPP; PAL-179)
