= 2,3-Dichlorophenylpiperazine =

Names
- Preferred IUPAC name 1-(2,3-Dichlorophenyl)piperazine

Identifiers
CAS Number	41202-77-1
3D model (JSmol)	Interactive image
ChemSpider	744460
ECHA InfoCard	100.126.497
PubChem CID	851833
UNII	891W3EV0B1
CompTox Dashboard (EPA)	DTXSID90961499
- InChI: InChI=1S/C10H12Cl2N2/c11-8-2-1-3-9(10(8)12)14-6-4-13-5-7-14/h1-3,13H,4-7H2 Key: UDQMXYJSNNCRAS-UHFFFAOYSA-N; InChI=1S/C10H12Cl2N2/c11-8-2-1-3-9(10(8)12)14-6-4-13-5-7-14/h1-3,13H,4-7H2 Key: UDQMXYJSNNCRAS-UHFFFAOYAH; InChI=1/C10H12Cl2N2/c11-8-2-1-3-9(10(8)12)14-6-4-13-5-7-14/h1-3,13H,4-7H2 Key: UDQMXYJSNNCRAS-UHFFFAOYAH
- SMILES: Clc1c(Cl)c(ccc1)N2CCNCC2

Properties
Chemical formula	C_{10}H_{12}Cl_{2}N_{2}
Molar mass	231.12 g/mol
Appearance	brown oil
Density	1.272g/cm^{3} °C
Melting point	242 to 244 °C (468 to 471 °F; 515 to 517 K)
Boiling point	365.1 °C (689.2 °F; 638.2 K) at 760mmHg

Hazards
Flash point	174.6 °C (346.3 °F; 447.8 K)
- Except where otherwise noted, data are given for materials in their standard state (at 25 °C [77 °F], 100 kPa). verify (what is ?) Infobox references

2,3-Dichlorophenylpiperazine (2,3-DCPP or DCPP) is a chemical compound from the phenylpiperazine family. It is both a precursor in the synthesis of aripiprazole and one of its metabolites. It is unclear whether 2,3-DCPP is pharmacologically active as a serotonin receptor agonist similar to its close analogue 3-chlorophenylpiperazine (mCPP), though it has been shown to act as a partial agonist of the dopamine D_{2} and D_{3} receptors.

== Legality ==
2,3-DCPP has been made illegal in Japan and Hungary after having been identified in seized designer drug samples.

== List of derivatives ==
1. Aripiprazole
2. Cariprazine
3. BAK 2-66
4. Brilaroxazine (formally RP5063)
5. FAUC-365 [474432-66-1]
6. CJB-090 2xHCl [595584-40-0]
7. NGB 2849 [189061-11-8]
8. NGB 2904 Fb: [189061-11-8] HCl: [189060-98-8]
9. PG-01037 2xHCl: [675599-62-9]
10. PG648
11. Aripiptranyl (Abilifarnate)
12. PGX-2000001 U.S. patent 20,070,142,399
13. So-called R-22
14. So-called JJC 7−065
15. R-PG-648

== Positional Isomer ==
3,4-DCPP, CAS# 57260-67-0

The positional isomer 3,4-dichlorophenylpiperazine (3,4-DCPP) is also known, and acts as both a serotonin releaser via the serotonin transporter, and a β_{1}-adrenergic receptor blocker, though with relatively low affinity at both targets.

== See also ==
- Substituted piperazine
- Phenylpiperazine
- ortho-Bromophenylpiperazine
