= Methoxypiperamide =

Chemical compound

Legal status
- Legal status: AU: S9 (Prohibited substance); EU: List I (Hungary)

Identifiers
- IUPAC name: (4-Methoxyphenyl)(4-methylpiperazin-1-yl)methanone
- CAS Number: 67023-02-3
- PubChem CID: 805654
- ChemSpider: 704980
- UNII: QD2GQ3VGF4
- CompTox Dashboard (EPA): DTXSID501032899

Chemical and physical data
- Formula: C_{13}H_{18}N_{2}O_{2}
- Molar mass: 234.299 g·mol^{−1}
- 3D model (JSmol): Interactive image
- SMILES: COC1=CC=C(C=C1)C(=O)N2CCN(CC2)C
- InChI: InChI=1S/C13H18N2O2/c1-14-7-9-15(10-8-14)13(16)11-3-5-12(17-2)6-4-11/h3-6H,7-10H2,1-2H3; Key:DWPVVZZGGGCRRM-UHFFFAOYSA-N

Methoxypiperamide (also known as MeOP and MEXP) is a psychoactive drug of the piperazine class that has been sold online as a designer drug. It is the 4-methoxy-α-keto analog of methylbenzylpiperazine.

Very little data exists about the pharmacology and toxicity of methoxypiperamide; however, the US state of Vermont classifies it as a hallucinogen.

== Legal status ==
Methoxypiperamide is a controlled substance in Vermont as of January 2016, and also in Hungary.

== See also ==
- Substituted piperazine
- Sunifiram
