= Meta-Chlorophenylpiperazine =

Serotonergic drug

mCPP

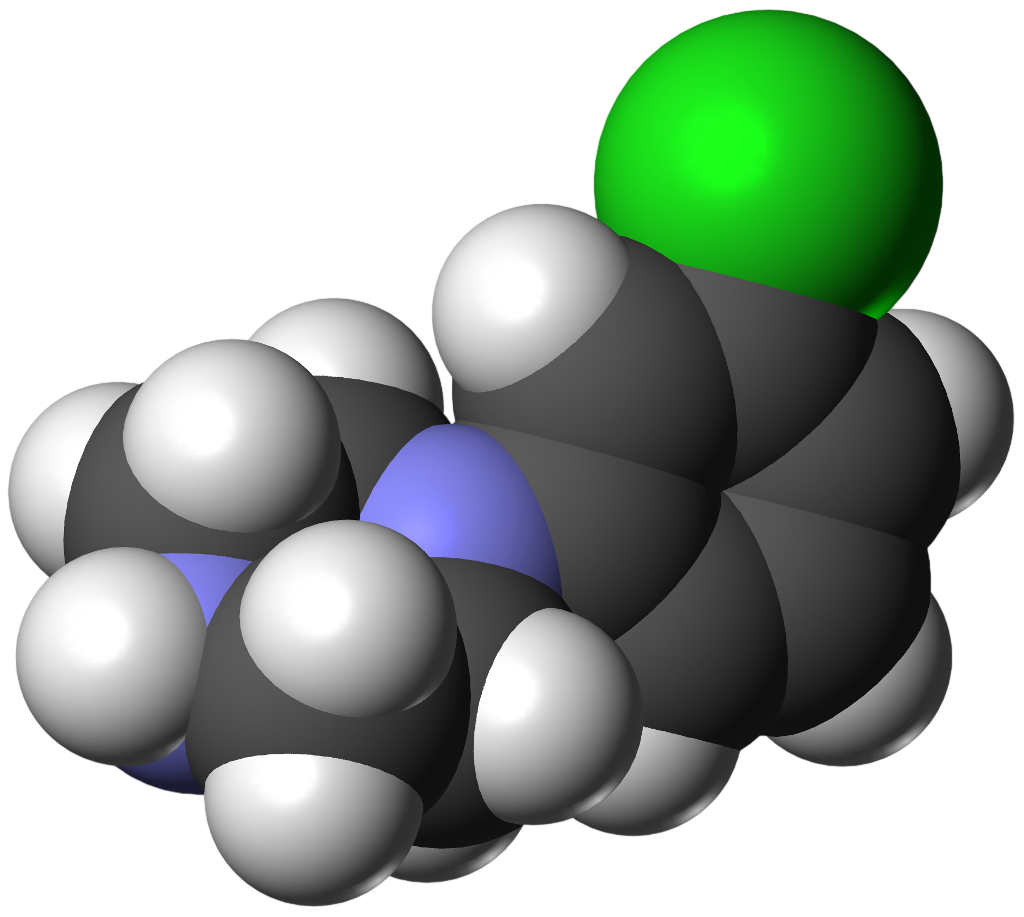

Clinical data
- Other names: m‑Chlorophenylpiperazine; mCPP; MCPP; 3‑Chlorophenylpiperazine; 3‑CPP
- Routes of administration: Oral, intranasal, rectal
- Drug class: Non-selective serotonin receptor agonist; Serotonin 5-HT_{2C} receptor agonist; Serotonin releasing agent
- ATC code: N06

Legal status
- Legal status: BR: Class F2 (Prohibited psychotropics); DE: Anlage II (Authorized trade only, not prescriptible)

Pharmacokinetic data
- Bioavailability: 12–108%
- Metabolism: Liver (CYP2D6)
- Elimination half-life: 4–14 hours
- Excretion: Urine

Identifiers
- IUPAC name: 1‑(3‑chlorophenyl)piperazine
- CAS Number: 6640-24-0
- PubChem CID: 1355
- IUPHAR/BPS: 142
- DrugBank: DB12110
- ChemSpider: 1314
- UNII: REY0CNO998
- KEGG: C11738
- ChEBI: CHEBI:10588
- ChEMBL: ChEMBL478
- CompTox Dashboard (EPA): DTXSID9045138
- ECHA InfoCard: 100.026.959

Chemical and physical data
- Formula: C_{10}H_{13}ClN_{2}
- Molar mass: 196.68 g·mol^{−1}
- 3D model (JSmol): Interactive image
- SMILES: Clc1cc(ccc1)N2CCNCC2
- InChI: InChI=1S/C10H13ClN2/c11-9-2-1-3-10(8-9)13-6-4-12-5-7-13/h1-3,8,12H,4-7H2; Key:VHFVKMTVMIZMIK-UHFFFAOYSA-N

meta-Chlorophenylpiperazine (mCPP) is a psychoactive drug of the phenylpiperazine family. It was initially developed in the late-1970s and used in scientific research before being sold as a designer drug in the mid-2000s. It has been detected in pills touted as legal alternatives to illicit stimulants in New Zealand and pills sold as "ecstasy" in Europe and the United States.

Despite its advertisement as a recreational substance, mCPP is actually generally considered to be an unpleasant experience and is not desired by drug users. It lacks any reinforcing effects, but has "psychostimulant, anxiety-provoking, and hallucinogenic effects." It is also known to produce dysphoric, depressive, and anxiogenic effects in rodents and humans, and can induce panic attacks in individuals susceptible to them. It also worsens obsessive–compulsive symptoms in people with the disorder.

mCPP is known to induce headaches in humans and has been used for testing potential antimigraine medications. It has potent anorectic effects and has encouraged the development of selective 5-HT_{2C} receptor agonists for the treatment of obesity as well.

== Use and effects ==
mCPP has been extensively studied in humans as a probe of serotonin system function. It produces effects in humans including "feeling high", anxiety, panic, dysphoria, depression, depersonalization, stimulation, euphoria, sedation, mild hallucinogenic effects, exacerbation of obsessive–compulsive symptoms, sympathetic arousal, migraine headaches, and appetite suppression, among others. The drug consistently induces anxiety and panic at sufficiently high doses, especially when given intravenously. In addition, it consistently induces migraine-like headaches in around half of individuals.

mCPP appears to have some MDMA-like effects in humans. However, in contrast to MDMA and dextroamphetamine, mCPP did not produce reinforcing effects in humans. mCPP's hallucinogenic effects, measured by the Hallucinogen Rating Scale (HRS), are considerably less intense than those of conventional serotonergic psychedelics like psilocybin and dimethyltryptamine (DMT), and are more akin to the subtle psychedelic-like effects of MDMA. Many previous studies have not reported any hallucinogenic effects of mCPP at all and some modern publications have concluded that mCPP is non-hallucinogenic, whilst noting that hallucinations have sometimes been reported when high doses are used. mCPP does not seem to affect aggression in humans, albeit based on limited data.

Continuous daily administration of mCPP results in rapid development of tolerance to many of its effects in humans that occurs within a few days.

== Pharmacology ==
=== Pharmacodynamics ===
meta-Chlorophenylpiperazine
Site	K_{i} (nM)	Species	Refs
SERT	202–432	Human	
NET	1,940–4,360	Human	
DAT	ND	ND	ND
5-HT_{1A}	44–400	Human	
5-HT_{1B}	89–501	Human	
5-HT_{1D}	210–1,300	Human	
5-HT_{1E}	ND	ND	ND
5-HT_{1F}	ND	ND	ND
5-HT_{2A}	32–398	Human	
5-HT_{2B}	3.2–63	Human	
5-HT_{2C}	3.4–251	Human	
5-HT_{3}	427	Human	
5-HT_{4}	ND	ND	ND
5-HT_{5A}	1,354	Human	
5-HT_{6}	1,748	Human	
5-HT_{7}	163	Human	
α_{1}	97–2,900	Human	
α_{1A}	1,386	Human	
α_{1B}	915	Human	
α_{1D}	ND	ND	ND
α_{2}	112–570	Human	
α_{2A}	145	Human	
α_{2B}	106	Human	
α_{2C}	124	Human	
β	2,500	Human	
β_{1}	2,359	Human	
β_{2}	3,474	Human	
D_{1}	7,000	Human	
D_{2}	>10,000	Human	
D_{3}	>10,000	Rat	
D_{4}	ND	ND	ND
D_{5}	>10,000	Human	
H_{1}	326	Human	
mAChRs	>10,000	Human	
nAChRs	>10,000	Human	
σ_{1}	ND	ND	ND
σ_{2}	8,350	Rat	
I_{1}	759	Rat	
VDCC	6,043	Rat	
Values are K_{i} (nM). The smaller the value, the more strongly the drug binds to the site.

mCPP possesses significant affinity for the 5-HT_{1A}, 5-HT_{1B}, 5-HT_{1D}, 5-HT_{2A}, 5-HT_{2B}, 5-HT_{2C}, 5-HT_{3}, and 5-HT_{7} receptors, as well as the SERT. It also has some affinity for α_{1}-adrenergic, α_{2}-adrenergic, H_{1}, I_{1}, and NET. It behaves as an agonist at most serotonin receptors. mCPP has been shown to act not only as a serotonin reuptake inhibitor but as a serotonin releasing agent as well.

mCPP's strongest actions are at the 5-HT_{2B} and 5-HT_{2C} receptors and its discriminative cue is mediated primarily by 5-HT_{2C}. Its negative effects such as anxiety, headaches, and appetite loss are likely mediated by its actions on the 5-HT_{2C} receptor. Other effects of mCPP include nausea, hypoactivity, and penile erection, the latter two the result of increased 5-HT_{2C} activity and the former likely via 5-HT_{3} stimulation. mCPP is known to induce migraines and this may be mediated by serotonin 5-HT_{2B} receptor agonism.

In comparison studies, mCPP has approximately 10-fold selectivity for the human 5-HT_{2C} receptor over the human 5-HT_{2A} and 5-HT_{2B} receptors (K_{i} = 3.4 nM vs. 32.1 and 28.8 nM). It acts as a partial agonist of the human 5-HT_{2A} and 5-HT_{2C} receptors but as an antagonist of the human 5-HT_{2B} receptors.

mCPP does not produce the head-twitch response, a behavioral proxy of psychedelic effects, in rodents. Instead, it has been found to dose-dependently antagonize the head-twitch response induced by the serotonergic psychedelic DOI. However, when mCPP is combined with the selective serotonin 5-HT_{2C} receptor antagonist SB-242084, it is able to dose-dependently induce head twitches. These findings suggest that serotonin 5-HT_{2C} receptor activation inhibits and can mask the head-twitch response induced by serotonin 5-HT_{2A} receptor agonists.

The anxiety- and panic-inducing effects of mCPP in humans can be blocked or reduced by non-selective serotonin receptor antagonists such as metergoline and to a lesser extent methysergide as well as by the serotonin 5-HT_{2A} and 5-HT_{2C} receptor antagonist ritanserin. Chronic pre-treatment with serotonin reuptake inhibitors like fluoxetine and clomipramine can also reverse the anxiogenic effects of mCPP. Relatedly, serotonin reuptake inhibitors also reduce many other effects of mCPP and this is thought to be related to desensitization of serotonin 5-HT_{2C} and 5-HT_{2A} receptors. The benzodiazepine alprazolam can block mCPP-induced anxiety as well.

mCPP has been found to dose-dependently increase oxytocin levels in rodents. It can increase oxytocin levels by up to 3- to 6-fold at high doses. The oxytocin increases caused by mCPP are near-completely blocked by the serotonin 5-HT_{2} receptor antagonists mianserin, LY-53857, and metergoline, but are minimally affected by the serotonin 5-HT_{2A} receptor antagonist ketanserin. These findings suggest the involvement of the serotonin 5-HT_{2C} receptor in oxytocin secretion with mCPP rather than other serotonin receptors like the serotonin 5-HT_{2A} receptor. In humans, the drug robustly increased oxytocin levels in women but not in men.

=== Pharmacokinetics ===
The oral bioavailability of mCPP ranges from 12 to 108% in different individuals. Peak levels of mCPP vary 8-fold after oral administration and 2.3-fold after intravenous administration. Relatedly, mCPP shows marked interindividual variability in its pharmacokinetics, which has limited its usefulness for various applications. mCPP is metabolized via the CYP2D6 isoenzyme by hydroxylation to para-hydroxy-mCPP (p-OH-mCPP) and this plays a major role in its metabolism. Its elimination half-life ranges from 2.4 to 6.8 hours and is similar after oral and intravenous administration. In other research, a half-life range of 4 to 14 hours has been given.

mCPP is a metabolite of a variety of other piperazine drugs including trazodone, nefazodone, etoperidone, mepiprazole, cloperidone, peraclopone, and BRL-15,572. It is formed by dealkylation via CYP3A4. Caution should be exercised in concomitant administration of CYP2D6 inhibitors such as bupropion, fluoxetine, paroxetine, and thioridazine with drugs that produce mCPP as a metabolite as these drugs are known to increase concentrations of the parent molecule (e.g., trazodone) and of mCPP. It has been argued that clinical use of trazodone should be limited or abandoned due to mCPP being a metabolite of trazodone and mCPP's various well-known adverse effects.

== Chemistry ==
=== Synthesis ===
The chemical synthesis of mCPP has been described.

=== Analogues ===
Analogues of mCPP include:

- 1-Benzylpiperazine (BZP)
- 1-Methyl-4-benzylpiperazine (MBZP)
- 1,4-Dibenzylpiperazine (DBZP)
- 3-Trifluoromethylphenylpiperazine (TFMPP)
- 3,4-Methylenedioxy-1-benzylpiperazine (MDBZP)
- 4-Bromo-2,5-dimethoxy-1-benzylpiperazine (2C-B-BZP)
- 4-Fluorophenylpiperazine (pFPP)
- 4-Methoxyphenylpiperazine (MeOPP)

Some additional analogues include quipazine, ORG-12962, and 3C-PEP.

== History ==
mCPP was first described in the scientific literature by at least 1976, specifically as a metabolite of trazodone. Subsequently, it was characterized in greater detail in 1979 and thereafter. The drug emerged as a novel designer drug by 2003 or 2004.

== Society and culture ==
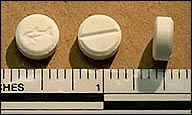
Tablets containing mCPP confiscated by the DEA in Vernon Hills, Illinois.

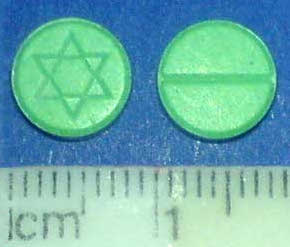
Tablets containing mCPP confiscated by the Kriminalpolizei in Europe at the end of 2008.

=== Legal status ===
==== Belgium ====
mCPP is illegal in Belgium.

==== Brazil ====
mCPP is illegal in Brazil.

==== Canada ====
mCPP is not a controlled drug in Canada.

==== China ====
As of October 2015 mCPP is a controlled substance in China.

==== Czech Republic ====
mCPP is legal in the Czech Republic.

==== Denmark ====
mCPP is illegal in Denmark.

==== Finland ====
mCPP is illegal in Finland.

==== Germany ====
mCPP is illegal in Germany.

==== Hungary ====
mCPP is illegal in Hungary since 2012.

==== Japan ====
mCPP is illegal in Japan since 2006.

==== Netherlands ====
mCPP is legal in the Netherlands.

==== New Zealand ====
Based on the recommendation of the EACD, the New Zealand government has passed legislation which placed BZP, along with the other piperazine derivatives TFMPP, mCPP, pFPP, MeOPP and MBZP, into Class C of the New Zealand Misuse of Drugs Act 1975. A ban was intended to come into effect in New Zealand on December 18, 2007, but the law change did not go through until the following year, and the sale of BZP and the other listed piperazines became illegal in New Zealand as of 1 April 2008. An amnesty for possession and usage of these drugs remained until October 2008, at which point they became completely illegal. However, mCPP is legally used for scientific research.

==== Norway ====
mCPP is illegal in Norway.

==== Russia ====
mCPP is illegal in Russia.

==== Sweden ====
mCPP is illegal in Sweden.

==== Poland ====
mCPP is illegal in Poland.

==== United States ====
mCPP is not scheduled at the federal level in the United States, but it is possible that it could be considered a controlled substance analog of BZP, in which case purchase, sale, or possession could be prosecuted under the Federal Analog Act.

However, "chlorophenylpiperazine" is a Schedule I controlled substance in the state of Florida making it illegal to buy, sell, or possess in this state.

United Arab Emirates

mCPP is illegal in the UAE, the country has strict drug laws, and many psychoactive substances are classified as controlled or prohibited.

==== Turkey ====
mCPP is illegal in Turkey since 20/05/2009.

== See also ==
- Substituted piperazine
