= 1-(4-(Trifluoromethyl)phenyl)piperazine =

Chemical compound

Clinical data
- Other names: N-(para-[Trifluoromethyl)phenyl]piperazine, 1-(α,α,α-Trifluoro-p-tolyl)piperazine

Pharmacokinetic data
- Bioavailability: Unknown

Identifiers
- IUPAC name: 1-[4-(Trifluoromethyl)phenyl]piperazine
- CAS Number: 30459-17-7
- PubChem CID: 24887519
- ChemSpider: 108602
- UNII: VG9TSZ5YPW
- CompTox Dashboard (EPA): DTXSID80184534
- ECHA InfoCard: 100.045.631

Chemical and physical data
- Formula: C_{11}H_{13}F_{3}N_{2}
- Molar mass: 230.234 g·mol^{−1}
- 3D model (JSmol): Interactive image
- SMILES: FC(F)(F)c1ccc(cc1)N2CCNCC2
- InChI: InChI=1S/C11H13F3N2/c12-11(13,14)9-1-3-10(4-2-9)16-7-5-15-6-8-16/h1-4,15H,5-8H2; Key:IBQMAPSJLHRQPE-UHFFFAOYSA-N

1-[4-(Trifluoromethyl)phenyl]piperazine (pTFMPP) is a serotonergic releasing agent. It is rarely encountered as a designer drug but is much less common than the "normal" isomer meta-TFMPP.

== See also ==
- Substituted piperazine
