= Niaprazine =

Sedative-hypnotic medication

Clinical data
- Trade names: Nopron
- Other names: CERM-1709
- AHFS/Drugs.com: International Drug Names
- Routes of administration: Oral
- Drug class: Serotonin 5-HT_{2A} receptor antagonist; α_{1}-Adrenergic receptor antagonist
- ATC code: N05CM16 (WHO)

Legal status
- Legal status: In general: ℞ (Prescription only)

Pharmacokinetic data
- Elimination half-life: ~4.5 hours

Identifiers
- IUPAC name: N-{4-[4-(4-fluorophenyl)piperazin- 1-yl]butan- 2-yl}pyridine- 3-carboxamide
- CAS Number: 27367-90-4
- PubChem CID: 71919
- ChemSpider: 64930
- UNII: R2H3YN6E3L
- KEGG: D07333
- CompTox Dashboard (EPA): DTXSID10865369
- ECHA InfoCard: 100.044.014

Chemical and physical data
- Formula: C_{20}H_{25}FN_{4}O
- Molar mass: 356.445 g·mol^{−1}
- 3D model (JSmol): Interactive image
- SMILES: Fc3ccc(N2CCN(CCC(NC(=O)c1cccnc1)C)CC2)cc3
- InChI: InChI=1S/C20H25FN4O/c1-16(23-20(26)17-3-2-9-22-15-17)8-10-24-11-13-25(14-12-24)19-6-4-18(21)5-7-19/h2-7,9,15-16H,8,10-14H2,1H3,(H,23,26); Key:RSKQGBFMNPDPLR-UHFFFAOYSA-N

Niaprazine (INN; brand name Nopron) is a sedative-hypnotic drug of the phenylpiperazine group. It has been used in the treatment of sleep disturbances since the early 1970s in several European countries including France, Italy, and Luxembourg. It is commonly used with children and adolescents on account of its favorable safety and tolerability profile and lack of abuse potential.

Originally believed to act as an antihistamine and anticholinergic, niaprazine was later discovered to have low or no binding affinity for the H_{1} and mACh receptors (K_{i} = > 1 μM), and was instead found to act as a potent and selective 5-HT_{2A} and α_{1}-adrenergic receptor antagonist (K_{i} = 75 nM and 86 nM, respectively). It possesses low or no affinity for the 5-HT_{1A}, 5-HT_{2B}, D_{2}, and β-adrenergic, as well as at SERT and VMAT (K_{i} = all > 1 μM), but it does have some affinity for the α_{2}-adrenergic receptor (K_{i} = 730 nM).

Niaprazine has been shown to metabolize to the compound para-fluorophenylpiperazine (pFPP) in a similar manner to how trazodone and nefazodone metabolize to meta-chlorophenylpiperazine (mCPP). It is unclear what role, if any, pFPP plays in the clinical effects of niaprazine. However, from animal studies it is known that pFPP, unlike niaprazine, does not produce sedative effects, and instead exerts a behavioral profile indicative of serotonergic activation.

== Synthesis ==

A Mannich reaction using 4-fluorophenylpiperazine (1), 1,3,5-trioxane (2) and acetone gives the ketone (4). Reaction with hydroxylamine produces the oxime, (5), which is reduced with lithium aluminium hydride to give the amine (6). Amide formation with nicotinic acid (7), activated as its acid chloride, yields niaprazine.
