= Substituted piperazine =

Class of chemical compounds

Substituted piperazines are a class of chemical compounds based on a piperazine core. Some are used as recreational drugs and some are used in scientific research.

== List of substituted piperazines ==
=== Benzylpiperazines ===
Chemical structures of selected benzylpiperazines
1-Benzylpiperazine (BZP)

1-Methyl-4-benzylpiperazine (MBZP)

1,4-Dibenzylpiperazine (DBZP)

3,4-Methylenedioxy-1-benzylpiperazine (MDBZP)

4-Bromo-2,5-dimethoxy-1-benzylpiperazine (2C-B-BZP)

Methoxypiperamide (MeOP, MEXP) ((4-methoxyphenyl)(4-methylpiperazin-1-yl)methanone)

Sunifiram (1-benzoyl-4-propanoylpiperazine)

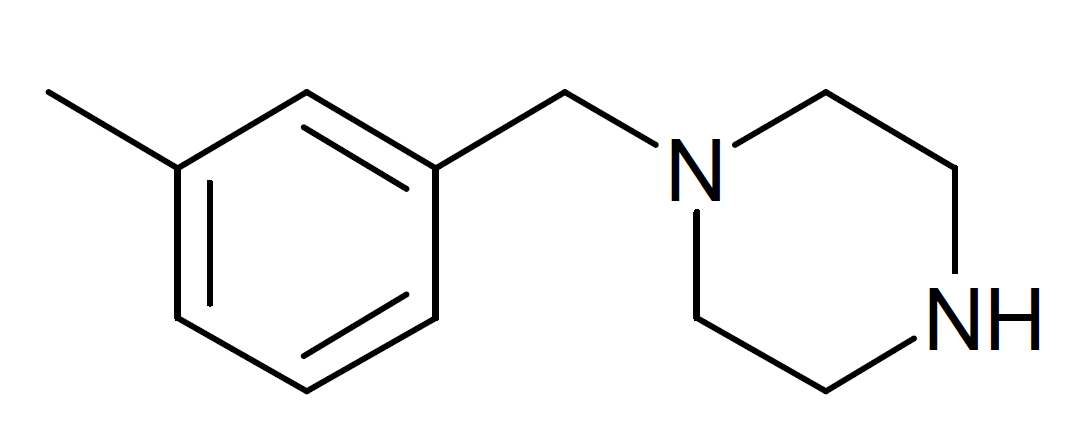
3-Methylbenzylpiperazine (3-MeBZP)

Befuraline
(also produces benzylpiperazine as a metabolite)

Fipexide
(also produces substituted benzylpiperazine as a metabolite)

Piberaline
(also produces benzylpiperazine as a metabolite)

=== Phenylpiperazines ===
1-Phenylpiperazine (1-PP).

==== ortho-Substituted ====
- 2-Chlorophenylpiperazine (oCPP)
- 2-Methylphenylpiperazine (oMPP)
- 2-Methoxyphenylpiperazine (oMeOPP)
- Mefeclorazine
- Vortioxetine

Enpiprazole is known to produce oCPP as a metabolite. It was initially anticipated to produce oMeOPP as a metabolite, but this proved not to be the case.

==== meta-Substituted ====
- 3-Chlorophenylpiperazine (mCPP)
- 3-Methoxyphenylpiperazine (mMeOPP)
- 3-Trifluoromethylphenylpiperazine (TFMPP)
- 1-(3-Chlorophenyl)-4-(2-phenylethyl)piperazine (3C-PEP)

Trazodone, nefazodone, etoperidone, mepiprazole, and others produce mCPP as a metabolite.

==== para-Substituted ====
- 4-Chlorophenylpiperazine (pCPP)
- 4-Fluorophenylpiperazine (pFPP)
- 4-Methylphenylpiperazine (pMPP)
- 4-Methoxyphenylpiperazine (pMeOPP, MeOPP)
- 4-Nitrophenylpiperazine (pNPP; PAL-175) – selective partial serotonin releasing agent
- 4-Trifluoromethylphenylpiperazine (pTFMPP)

==== Multiple substitutions ====
- 2,3-Dichlorophenylpiperazine (2,3-DCPP)
- 3,4-Dichlorophenylpiperazine (3,4-DCPP)
- 2,3-Dimethylphenylpiperazine (DMPP)
- 3-Trifluoromethyl-4-chlorophenylpiperazine (TFMCPP; PAL-179) – selective partial serotonin releasing agent

==== Others ====
- 1-Phenylpiperazine (PP)

=== Other arylpiperazines ===
- 1-(1-Naphthyl)piperazine (1-NP)
- 1-(2-Pyrimidinyl)piperazine (1-PP)
- 6-Chloro-2-(1-piperazinyl)quinoxaline (CPQ)
- ORG-12962 (1-(5-trifluoromethyl-6-chloropyridin-2-yl)piperazine)
- Quipazine (2-piperazin-1-ylquinoline)

Many azapirones such as buspirone, gepirone, and tandospirone produce 1-PP as a metabolite.

=== By drug class ===
Antianginals

- Ranolazine
- Trimetazidine

Antidepressants

- Amoxapine
- Befuraline
- Buspirone
- Flesinoxan
- Gepirone
- Ipsapirone
- Nefazodone
- Piberaline
- Tandospirone
- Trazodone
- Vilazodone
- Vortioxetine
- Zalospirone

Antihistamines

- Buclizine
- Cetirizine
- Cinnarizine
- Cyclizine
- Hydroxyzine
- Levocetirizine
- Meclizine
- Niaprazine

Antiserotonergics

- EGIS-7625

Antipsychotics

- Typical
  - Flupentixol
  - Fluphenazine
  - Perphenazine
  - Prochlorperazine
  - Thiothixene
  - Trifluoperazine
  - Zuclopenthixol
  - Acetophenazine
  - Carfenazine
- Atypical
  - Amperozide
  - Aripiprazole
  - Clozapine
  - Lurasidone
  - Olanzapine
  - Perospirone
  - Ziprasidone
  - Quetiapine
  - Cariprazine

Recreational Drugs

- 4-Bromo-2,5-dimethoxy-1-benzylpiperazine (2C-B-BZP)
- 1-Benzylpiperazine (BZP)
- 2,3-Dichlorophenylpiperazine (DCPP)
- 1,4-Dibenzylpiperazine (DBZP)
- 4-Methyl-1-benzylpiperazine (MBZP)
- 3-Chlorophenylpiperazine (mCPP)
- 3,4-Methylenedioxy-1-benzylpiperazine (MDBZP)
- 4-Methoxyphenylpiperazine (MeOPP)
- Methoxypiperamide (MeOP or MEXP)
- 4-Chlorophenylpiperazine (pCPP)
- 4-Fluorophenylpiperazine (pFPP)
- 3-Trifluoromethylphenylpiperazine (TFMPP)

Urologicals

- Sildenafil
- Vardenafil

Others

- 6-Nitroquipazine
- Antrafenine
- Diethylcarbamazine
- Diphenazine
- Fipexide
- Imatinib
- NSI-189
- Pipobroman (antineoplastic agent)
- Quipazine
- Sunifiram (nootropic)
- Tolpiprazole (tranquilizer)

== Activities ==
Monoamine release (EC_{50}, nM) of arylpiperazines
| Compound | PAL # | Serotonin | Norepinephrine | Dopamine | Type | Ref |
|---|---|---|---|---|---|---|
| 1-Benzylpiperazine (BZP) | ND | 6050–>100000 | 62.2–68 | 175–600 | NDRA | |
| 1-Phenylpiperazine (PP) | ND | 880 | 186 | 2530 | SNRA | |
| 2-Me-PP (oMPP) | PAL-169 | 175 | 39.1 | 296–542 | SNDRA | |
| 2-OMe-PP (oMeOPP) | ND | ND | ND | ND | ND | ND |
| 2-TFM-PP (oTFMPP) | ND | 570 | 350 | 11200 | SNRA | |
| 2-SMe-PP (oMTPP) | ND | 270 | >10000 | >10000 | SRA | |
| 2-Et-PP (oEtPP) | ND | 290 | 830 | >10000 | SNRA | |
| 2-Chloro-PP (oCPP) | ND | 310 | 26 | >3000 | NRA | |
| 2-Bromo-PP (oBPP) | ND | 132 | 33 | 250 | SNDRA | |
| 2-Nitro-PP (oNPP) | ND | 1870 | 770 | >10000 | SNRA | |
| 3-Chloro-PP (mCPP) | ND | 28–39 | 1400–>10000 | >10000–63000 | SRA | |
| 3-Fluoro-PP (mFPP) | ND | 115 | 340 | 2400 | SNRA | |
| 3-Me-PP (mMPP) | ND | 110 | >20000 | >20000 | SRA | |
| 3-OMe-PP (mMeOPP) | ND | 650 | >10000 | >10000 | SRA | |
| 3-OH-PP (mOHPP) | ND | 230 | 174 | 2500 | SNRA | |
| 3-TFM-PP (TFMPP) | ND | 121 | >10000 | >10000 | SRA | |
| 4-Chloro-PP (pCPP) | ND | ND | ND | ND | ND | ND |
| 4-Fluoro-PP (pFPP) | ND | 230 | 3200 | >10000 | SRA | |
| 4-Me-PP (pMPP) | PAL-233 | 220 | >10000 | >20000 | SRA | |
| 4-OMe-PP (pMeOPP) | ND | 3200 | 440–1500 | 6300–11000 | SNDRA | |
| 4-TFM-PP (pTFMPP) | ND | ND | ND | ND | ND | ND |
| 4-Ac-PP (pAcPP) | ND | 50 | 150 | 3000 | SNRA | |
| 4-CN-PP (pCNPP) | ND | 36 | 6300 | >10000 | SRA | |
| 4-Phenyl-PP (pPhPP) | ND | >10000 | 1520 | 5200 | NDRA | |
| 4-OH-PP (pOHPP) | ND | >10000 | 230 | 850 | NDRA | |
| 4-Nitro-PP (pNPP) | PAL-175 | 19–43 | >10000 | >10000 | SRA | |
| 2,3-Dichloro-PP (2,3-DCPP) | ND | 10 | 36 | 108 | SNDRA | |
| 2,3-DiMe-PP (2,3-DMPP) | PAL-218 | 24–26 | 13.7–56 | 1207–1320 | SNRA | |
| 2,4-Difluoro-PP (2,4-DFPP) | ND | 470 | 2300 | >10000 | SNRA | |
| 3,4-Dichloro-PP (3,4-DCPP) | ND | ND | ND | ND | ND | ND |
| 3,4-Difluoro-PP (3,4-DFPP) | ND | 76 | 9200 | >10000 | SRA | |
| 3-TFM-4-Cl-PP (TFMCPP) | PAL-179 | 33 | >10000 | >10000 | SRA | |
Notes: Assays were done using rat brain synaptosomes.

== See also ==
- Substituted α-alkyltryptamine
- Substituted amphetamine
- Substituted cathinone
- Substituted methylenedioxyphenethylamine
- Substituted phenethylamine
- Substituted phenylmorpholine
- Substituted tryptamine
