= 3-Trifluoromethyl-4-chlorophenylpiperazine =

TFMCPP

Clinical data
- Other names: TFMCPP; meta-Trifluoromethyl-para-chlorophenylpiperazine; PAL-179; PAL179
- Drug class: Selective partial serotonin releasing agent

Identifiers
- IUPAC name: 1-[4-chloro-3-(trifluoromethyl)phenyl]piperazine
- CAS Number: 41213-04-1
- PubChem CID: 2778137
- ChemSpider: 2058397
- UNII: 0BN43QW3C6
- CompTox Dashboard (EPA): DTXSID80194138

Chemical and physical data
- Formula: C_{11}H_{12}ClF_{3}N_{2}
- Molar mass: 264.68 g·mol^{−1}
- 3D model (JSmol): Interactive image
- SMILES: C1CN(CCN1)C2=CC(=C(C=C2)Cl)C(F)(F)F
- InChI: InChI=1S/C11H12ClF3N2/c12-10-2-1-8(7-9(10)11(13,14)15)17-5-3-16-4-6-17/h1-2,7,16H,3-6H2; Key:SOVLQDJRXJFKHO-UHFFFAOYSA-N

3-Trifluoromethyl-4-chlorophenylpiperazine (TFMCPP; code name PAL-179), or meta-trifluoromethyl-para-chlorophenylpiperazine, is a monoamine releasing agent of the phenylpiperazine family. It acts specifically as a selective partial serotonin releasing agent, with an EC_{50} of 33 nM and an E_{max} of 66%. The drug was inactive as a releasing agent of dopamine or norepinephrine (EC_{50} >10,000 nM). Its possible activity at serotonin receptors was not reported. TFMCPP was first described in the scientific literature by 2012.

== See also ==
- Substituted phenylpiperazine
- para-Nitrophenylpiperazine (pNPP; PAL-175)
