= Para-Fluorophenylpiperazine =

Chemical compound

pFPP

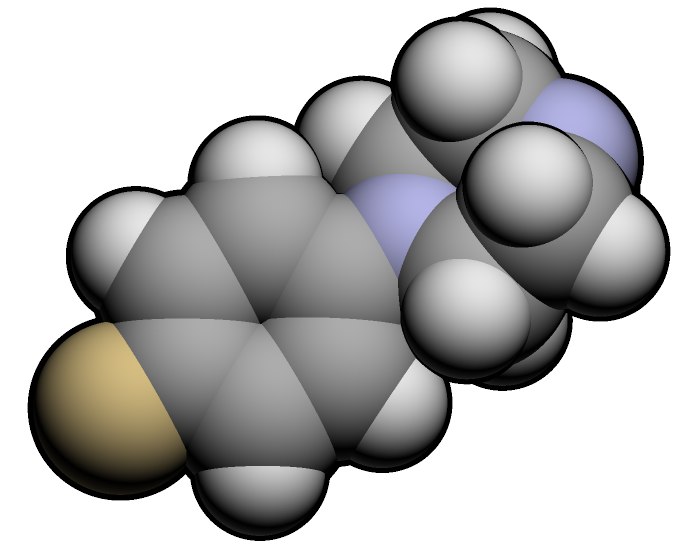

Clinical data
- Routes of administration: Oral

Legal status
- Legal status: DE: Anlage II (Authorized trade only, not prescriptible); NZ: Class C; II-P(Poland)

Pharmacokinetic data
- Metabolism: Hepatic
- Elimination half-life: 6–8 hours
- Excretion: Renal

Identifiers
- IUPAC name: 1-(4-fluorophenyl)piperazine
- CAS Number: 2252-63-3; dihydrochloride: 64090-19-3
- PubChem CID: 75260
- UNII: VML61BE244
- CompTox Dashboard (EPA): DTXSID50177039
- ECHA InfoCard: 100.017.134

Chemical and physical data
- Formula: C_{10}H_{13}FN_{2}
- Molar mass: 180.226 g·mol^{−1}
- 3D model (JSmol): Interactive image
- SMILES: C1CN(CCN1)C2=CC=C(C=C2)F
- InChI: InChI=1S/C10H13FN2/c11-9-1-3-10(4-2-9)13-7-5-12-6-8-13/h1-4,12H,5-8H2; Key:AVJKDKWRVSSJPK-UHFFFAOYSA-N

para-Fluorophenylpiperazine (pFPP, 4-FPP, 4-Fluorophenylpiperazine; Fluoperazine, Flipiperazine) is a piperazine derivative with mildly psychedelic and euphoriant effects. It has been sold as an ingredient in legal recreational drugs known as "Party pills", initially in New Zealand and subsequently in other countries around the world.

pFPP has been found in vitro to act mainly as a 5-HT_{1A} receptor agonist, with some additional affinity for the 5-HT_{2A} and 5-HT_{2C} receptors. It has also been shown to inhibit the reuptake of serotonin and norepinephrine, and to possibly induce their release.

pFPP was originally discovered as a metabolite of the hypnotic 5-HT_{2A} and α_{1}-adrenergic receptor antagonist niaprazine in 1982, but was rediscovered in 2003 as a potential recreational drug, and sold as an ingredient in "Party pills" in New Zealand, under brand names such as "The Big Grin", "Mashed", and "Extreme Beans". Subsequently it has continued to be used as an ingredient in black market "ecstasy" pills around the world.

pFPP has little stimulant effects, with its subjective effects derived mainly from its action as a 5-HT_{1A} receptor agonist. pFPP is active at doses between 20 and 150 mg, but higher doses cause a range of side-effects such as migraine headaches, muscle aches, anxiety, nausea, and vomiting. Metabolic studies have shown pFPP to be an inhibitor of various Cytochrome P450 enzymes in the liver which may contribute to its side-effect profile.

Based on the recommendation of the EACD, the New Zealand government has passed legislation which placed BZP, along with a number of other piperazine derivatives, into Class C of the New Zealand Misuse of Drugs Act 1975. A ban was intended to come into effect in New Zealand on December 18, 2007, but the law change did not go through until the following year, and the sale of BZP and the other listed piperazines became illegal in New Zealand as of 1 April 2008. An amnesty for possession and usage of these drugs remained until October 2008, at which point they became completely illegal. This drug has been detected in a drug-facilitated sexual assault case in the United States of America.

== See also ==
- Substituted piperazine
