= Dibenzylpiperazine =

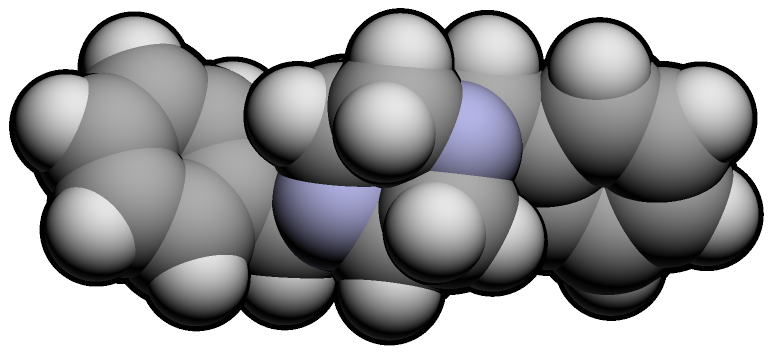

Names
- Preferred IUPAC name 1,4-Dibenzylpiperazine
- Other names DBZP

Identifiers
CAS Number	1034-11-3
3D model (JSmol)	Interactive image; Interactive image
ChemSpider	173653
ECHA InfoCard	100.153.085
PubChem CID	200601
UNII	616774W5JF
CompTox Dashboard (EPA)	DTXSID10899765
- InChI: InChI=1S/C18H22N2/c1-3-7-17(8-4-1)15-19-11-13-20(14-12-19)16-18-9-5-2-6-10-18/h1-10H,11-16H2 Key: YPUGLZQRXQQCSX-UHFFFAOYSA-N; InChI=1/C18H22N2/c1-3-7-17(8-4-1)15-19-11-13-20(14-12-19)16-18-9-5-2-6-10-18/h1-10H,11-16H2 Key: YPUGLZQRXQQCSX-UHFFFAOYAP
- SMILES: C1CN(CCN1CC2=CC=CC=C2)CC3=CC=CC=C3; c1ccc(cc1)CN2CCN(CC2)Cc3ccccc3

Properties
Chemical formula	C_{18}H_{22}N_{2}
Molar mass	266.388 g·mol^{−1}
- Except where otherwise noted, data are given for materials in their standard state (at 25 °C [77 °F], 100 kPa). verify (what is ?) Infobox references

Dibenzylpiperazine (DBZP) is a piperazine derivative often found as an impurity in the recreational stimulant drug benzylpiperazine (BZP). Presence of DBZP is a marker for low quality or badly made BZP. It can be made as a reaction byproduct during BZP synthesis, either because the reaction has been run at too high a temperature, or because an excess of benzyl chloride has been used.

== Pharmacology and effects ==
It is not known to have any stimulant effects in its own right, although this has not been tested.

== Toxicity ==
The toxicity of DBZP is unknown.

== Legal status ==
=== China ===
As of October 2015 DBZP is a controlled substance in China.

=== United States ===
DBZP is not scheduled as a controlled substance at the federal level in the United States. It is possible that it could be considered an analog BZP, in which case, sales or possession intended for human consumption could be prosecuted under the Federal Analog Act.

==== Florida ====
DBZP is a Schedule I controlled substance in the state of Florida making it illegal to buy, sell, or possess in Florida.

== See also ==
- Substituted piperazine
