= 3-Methylbenzylpiperazine =

Chemical compound

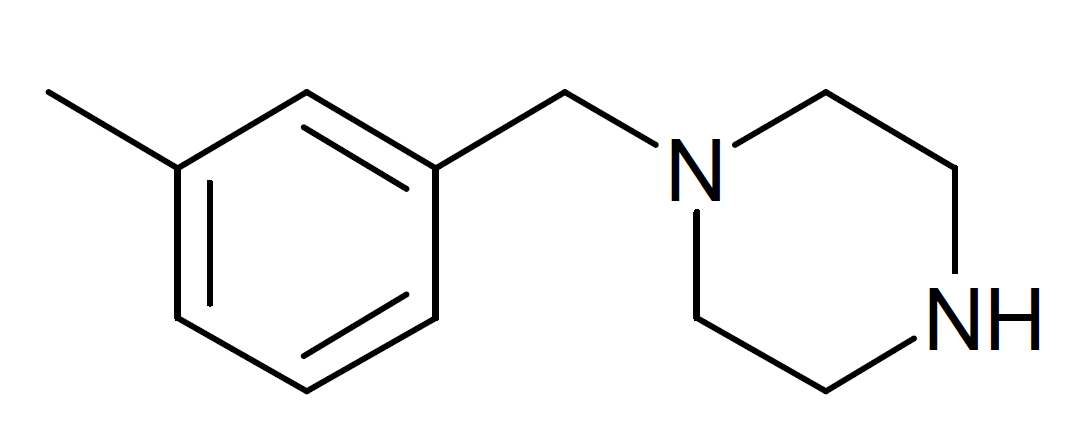

Identifiers
- IUPAC name: 1-(3-methylbenzyl)piperazine
- CAS Number: 5321-48-2
- PubChem CID: 79213
- ChemSpider: 71538
- UNII: LX9B7MME2X
- CompTox Dashboard (EPA): DTXSID40201291
- ECHA InfoCard: 100.023.805

Chemical and physical data
- Formula: C_{12}H_{18}N_{2}
- Molar mass: 190.290 g·mol^{−1}
- 3D model (JSmol): Interactive image
- SMILES: CC1=CC(=CC=C1)CN2CCNCC2
- InChI: InChI=1S/C12H18N2/c1-11-3-2-4-12(9-11)10-14-7-5-13-6-8-14/h2-4,9,13H,5-8,10H2,1H3; Key:VTEOTZPEMDQENX-UHFFFAOYSA-N

3-Methylbenzylpiperazine (3-Me-BZP) is a stimulant drug which is a derivative of benzylpiperazine. It has been sold as a designer drug, first being identified in Sweden in February 2012.

== See also ==
- Methylbenzylpiperazine
- Substituted piperazine
