= 2C-B-BZP =

Chemical compound

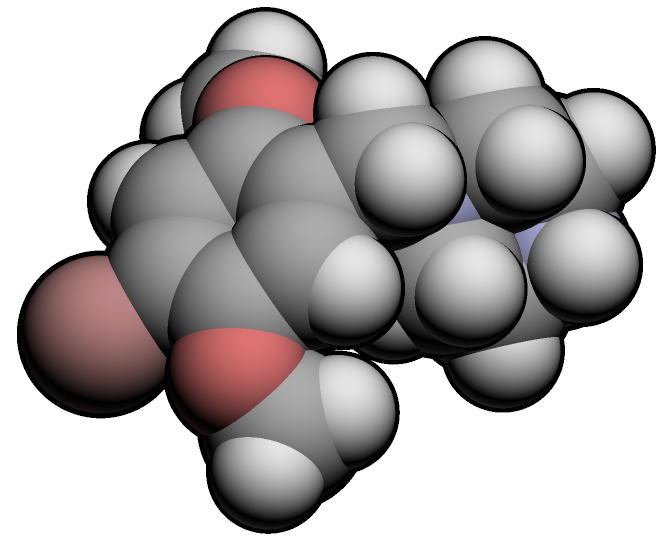

Legal status
- Legal status: DE: NpSG (Industrial and scientific use only)

Identifiers
- IUPAC name: 1-[(4-Bromo-2,5-dimethoxyphenyl)methyl]piperazine
- CAS Number: 1094424-37-9
- ChemSpider: 26234933
- UNII: R0E29C6K2K
- CompTox Dashboard (EPA): DTXSID00148936

Chemical and physical data
- Formula: C_{13}H_{19}BrN_{2}O_{2}
- Molar mass: 315.211 g·mol^{−1}
- 3D model (JSmol): Interactive image
- SMILES: C1(=CC(=C(C=C1CN2CCNCC2)OC)Br)OC
- InChI: InChI=1S/C13H19BrN2O2/c1-17-12-8-11(14)13(18-2)7-10(12)9-16-5-3-15-4-6-16/h7-8,15H,3-6,9H2,1-2H3; Key:OHXVYXBOJDDYJS-UHFFFAOYSA-N

4-Bromo-2,5-dimethoxy-1-benzylpiperazine (2C-B-BZP) is a psychoactive drug and research chemical of the piperazine chemical class which has been sold as a "designer drug". It produces stimulant effects similar to those of benzylpiperazine (BZP).

== Chemistry ==
2C-B-BZP contains a benzylpiperazine base as well as the ring-substitution pattern of the psychedelic phenethylamine 2C-B. 2C-B-BZP is not a phenethylamine itself and does not produce psychedelic effects, as the binding groups are in the wrong position to activate the 5-HT_{2A} receptor, while the phenylpiperazine homologue 2C-B-PP substitutes for DOM in DOM-trained rats with around one-tenth the potency of DOM, but does not substitute for TFMPP.

== Effects ==
2C-B-BZP produces stimulant effects which last 3–6 hours. It is also said by several sources to increase the effects of other compounds when combined. Side effects include headaches and nausea, similar to those of other recreationally-used piperazine derivatives.

== Legality ==
2C-B-BZP is unscheduled and uncontrolled in the United States, but possession and sale of 2C-B-BZP could possibly be prosecuted under the Federal Analog Act because of its structural similarities to benzylpiperazine. 2C-B-BZP is illegal to possess, use or sell in Japan where it used to be sold in local smartshops.

== See also ==
- Substituted piperazine
- 2C-B-morpholine
