= Para-Nitrophenylpiperazine =

para-Nitrophenylpiperazine

Clinical data
- Other names: pNPP; 4-NPP; 4-Nitro-PP; PAL-175; PAL175
- Drug class: Selective partial serotonin releasing agent

Identifiers
- IUPAC name: 1-(4-nitrophenyl)piperazine
- CAS Number: 6269-89-2
- PubChem CID: 80447
- ChemSpider: 72658
- UNII: SE8XST987K
- ChEMBL: ChEMBL165012
- CompTox Dashboard (EPA): DTXSID40978310
- ECHA InfoCard: 100.025.858

Chemical and physical data
- Formula: C_{10}H_{13}N_{3}O_{2}
- Molar mass: 207.233 g·mol^{−1}
- 3D model (JSmol): Interactive image
- SMILES: C1CN(CCN1)C2=CC=C(C=C2)[N+](=O)[O-]
- InChI: InChI=1S/C10H13N3O2/c14-13(15)10-3-1-9(2-4-10)12-7-5-11-6-8-12/h1-4,11H,5-8H2; Key:VWOJSRICSKDKAW-UHFFFAOYSA-N

para-Nitrophenylpiperazine (pNPP; code name PAL-175) is a monoamine releasing agent of the phenylpiperazine family. It acts specifically as a selective partial serotonin releasing agent, with an EC_{50} of 19 to 43 nM and an E_{max} of 57%. The drug was inactive as a releasing agent of dopamine or norepinephrine (EC_{50} >10,000 nM). Its possible activity at serotonin receptors was not reported. pNPP was first described in the scientific literature by 2012.

== See also ==
- 3-Trifluoromethyl-4-chlorophenylpiperazine (TFMCPP; PAL-179)
