= Para-Chlorophenylpiperazine =

Chemical compound

pCPP

Clinical data
- Other names: p‑Chlorophenylpiperazine; pCPP; PCPP; 4‑Chlorophenylpiperazine; 4‑CPP
- Routes of administration: Oral
- ATC code: None

Identifiers
- IUPAC name: 1‑(4‑chlorophenyl)piperazine
- CAS Number: 38212-33-8 38869-46-4 (dihydrochloride)
- PubChem CID: 97478
- ChemSpider: 87985
- UNII: FMD47JE5C3
- CompTox Dashboard (EPA): DTXSID90191592
- ECHA InfoCard: 100.155.613

Chemical and physical data
- Formula: C_{10}H_{13}ClN_{2}
- Molar mass: 196.68 g·mol^{−1}
- 3D model (JSmol): Interactive image
- SMILES: Clc1ccc(cc1)N2CCNCC2

para-Chlorophenylpiperazine (pCPP) is a psychoactive drug of the phenylpiperazine class. It is relatively obscure, with limited human use, and produces slightly psychedelic effects. It has been encountered in illicit capsules as a recreational drug similarly to other piperazines like mCPP. Scientific research has demonstrated pCPP to have serotonergic effects, likely acting as a non-selective serotonin receptor agonist and/or releasing agent.

A known use has been in the synthesis of L-745,870.

== See also ==
- Substituted piperazine
