= Standard for the Uniform Scheduling of Medicines and Poisons =

Australian legal instrument

Therapeutic Goods (Poisons Standard—October 2025) Instrument 2025

Department of Health, Disability and Ageing
- Citation: Link to instrument
- Territorial extent: Australia
- Enacted: 25 September 2025
- Commenced: 1 October 2025
- Authorizing legislation: Therapeutic Goods Act 1989

Repeals
- Therapeutic Goods (Poisons Standard—June 2025) Instrument 2025
- Status: In force

The Standard for the Uniform Scheduling of Medicines and Poisons (SUSMP), also known as the Poisons Standard for short, is an Australian legislative instrument produced by the Therapeutic Goods Administration (TGA). Before 2010, it was known as the Standard for the Uniform Scheduling of Drugs and Poisons (SUSDP). The SUSMP classifies drugs and poisons into different Schedules signifying the degree of control recommended to be exercised over their availability to the public.

The Schedules are referred to under State and Territory legislation for regulatory purposes. Although each State and Territory has its own laws, the vast majority of medicines and poisons are classified according to the SUSMP to achieve uniform national regulation.

== Schedules ==
=== Schedule 1 ===
Schedule 1 is blank. Schedule 1 does not currently contain any medicines or poisons.

=== Schedule 2: Pharmacy Medicine ===
Schedule 2 (S2) drugs and poisons, otherwise known as Pharmacy Medicines, are substances and preparations for therapeutic use that –

- are substantially safe in use but where advice or counselling is available if necessary;
- are for minor ailments or symptoms that –
  - can be easily recognised by the consumer and
  - do not require medical diagnosis or management.

Examples:

- Dextromethorphan, a cough suppressant
- Simple analgesics such as aspirin, paracetamol, ibuprofen and naproxen in packs containing more than 24 tablets (packs containing up to 16 tablets of simple analgesics are unscheduled, and can be sold in any shop)
- Hyoscine, used to treat motion sickness, postoperative nausea and vomiting.
- Nonsedating antihistamines such as loratadine
- Nasal sprays containing decongestants or steroids

The SUSMP March 2018 defines a Schedule 2 substance as "Substances, the safe use of which may require advice from a pharmacist and which should be available from a pharmacy or, where a pharmacy service is not available, from a licensed person."

The location of these medications in the pharmacy varies from state to state.

=== Schedule 3: Pharmacist Only Medicine ===
Schedule 3 (S3) drugs and poisons, otherwise known as Pharmacist Only Medicines, are substances and preparations for therapeutic use that –

- are substantially safe in use but require professional advice or counselling by a pharmacist;
- require pharmacist advice, management, or monitoring;
- are for ailments or symptoms that –
  - can be identified by the consumer and verified by a pharmacist;
  - do not require medical diagnosis, or only require initial medical diagnosis, and do not require close medical management.

Some states have subsets of Schedule 3 with additional requirements (see below). Only some Schedule 3 medicines may be advertised to the public.

Examples:

- Orlistat (trade name Xenical)
- Pseudoephedrine (marketed in Cold and Flu preparations)
- Salbutamol (Ventolin/Asmol)
- Rikodeine (dihydrocodeine)

=== Schedule 4: Prescription Only Medicine ===
Schedule 4 (S4) drugs and poisons, otherwise known as prescription only medicines, are substances and preparations for therapeutic use that –

- require professional medical, dental, or veterinary management or monitoring;
- are for ailments or symptoms that require professional medical, dental, or veterinary diagnosis or management;
- may require further evaluation for safety or efficacy;
- are new therapeutic substances.
- cost of the drug is high, or when there is a risk of dependence

The price of many Schedule 4 substances are subsidized by the Australian Government through the Pharmaceutical Benefits Scheme (PBS), when prescribed by an authorised prescriber. Certain medications may require an authority from the PBS. Situations that may require an authority include where the drug may only have benefit in limited conditions, the true cost of the drug is high, or when there is a risk of dependence. Some states have subsets of Schedule 4 with additional requirements (see below). Schedule 4 medicines cannot be advertised directly to the public.

Examples:

- Amoxicillin
- Anabolic steroids
- Apomorphine
- Cannabidiol in preparations for therapeutic use containing 2 percent or less of other cannabinoids found in cannabis (since June 2015)
- Cisplatin
- Co-codamol preparations comprising codeine and paracetamol
- Ephedrine
- Ergotamine
- Estradiol
- Fluticasone
- Ibogaine
- Isotretinoin
- Methoxyflurane
- Pseudoephedrine in large doses
- Salmeterol
- Tramadol
- Tretinoin
- Trimethoprim
- All benzodiazepines except flunitrazepam and alprazolam
- All:
  - SSRIs (e.g. fluoxetine, citalopram),
  - SNRIs (e.g. duloxetine, milnacipran),
  - TCAs (e.g. amitriptyline, imipramine)
  - MAOIs (e.g. selegiline, moclobemide).
- Antipsychotic drugs (e.g. aripiprazole, quetiapine)

=== Schedule 5: Caution ===
Schedule 5 (S5) drugs and poisons are substances and preparations that must have appropriate packaging and simple warning labels to display that these poisons:

- have low toxicity or a low concentration;
- have a low to moderate hazard;
- can cause only minor adverse effects to the human being in normal use;
- require caution in handling, storage, or use.

Examples:

- Ammonia
- Acetic acid (>30%)
- Boric acid
- Chlorinating compounds
- Clove oil
- Ivermectin (for use in animals)
- Lidocaine
- Methylated Spirits
- Petrol

Some of the above examples are subject to exceptions dependant on the specific preparation, concentration, or inclusion in other schedules.

=== Schedule 6: Poison ===
Must use distinctive packaging and strong warnings to display the potential for:

- moderate to high toxicity;
- that may cause death or severe injury if ingested, inhaled, or in contact with the skin or eyes.

Examples:

- Arsenic
- Beryllium
- Bromethalin
- Chloroform
- Cyanamide
- Safrole
- Toluene
- Xylene
- Ziram

Some of the above examples are subject to exceptions dependant on the specific preparation, concentration, or inclusion in other schedules.

=== Schedule 7: Dangerous Poison ===
Substances with a high potential for causing harm at low exposure and which:

- Require special precautions for manufacture, handling or use; or
- Only available to specialised and authorised users with appropriate skills
- Special regulations regarding their availability, possession, storage or use may apply

Examples:

- Azo Dyes
- Benzene
- Chlorine
- Demeton
- Phosphine
- Vinyl Chloride
- Nicotine

Some of the above examples are subject to exceptions dependant on the specific preparation, concentration, or inclusion in other schedules.

=== Schedule 8: Controlled Drug ===
Schedule 8 (S8) drugs and poisons, otherwise known as Controlled Drugs, are schedule 9 prohibited substances that are appropriate preparations for therapeutic use which have high potential for abuse and addiction. The possession of these medications without authority is the same as carrying a prohibited substance and is illegal.

Like schedule 4 substances, the price of many Schedule substances are subsidized through the Pharmaceutical Benefits Scheme (PBS), some of which may require an authority. In addition, in some states, all drugs on schedule 8 require a doctor to have an S8 permit before prescribing treatment. For example, in NSW the prescribing of Schedule 8 CNS stimulant medication (e.g., methylphenidate, dexamfetamine) requires authorisation from the NSW Ministry of Health (Pharmaceutical Services) and is generally restricted to specialists, such as paediatricians and psychiatrists. A GP (General Practitioner) cannot initiate the treatment, although they can prescribe in very limited circumstances, e.g. co-prescribing on behalf of the specialist; and in rural areas, if the patient has been diagnosed with ADHD, a GP may apply for the authority to prescribe. Patients who may require Schedule 8 CNS stimulant medication should be referred to a specialist for assessment.

Examples:

Drug	Brand name	Type/Use
Benzodiazepine
Alprazolam	Kalma	Sedative
Flunitrazepam	Hypnodorm	Sedative
Opioid
Fentanyl	Durogesic	Depressant analgesic
Carfentanil	N/A (Note: Carfentanil is not used or marketed in Australia for either human or animal medicine.)	Depressant analgesic
Oxycodone	Targin, Endone	Depressant analgesic
Dihydrocodeine	Paracodin	Cough suppressant
Buprenorphine	Suboxone (Note: In a combined formulation with naloxone.)	Opioid agonist therapy
Morphine	MS Contin	Depressant analgesic
Hydromorphone	Dilaudid	Depressant analgesic
Tapentadol	Palexia	Depressant analgesic
Stimulant
Dextroamphetamine	Dexedrine	ADHD stimulant
Lisdexamfetamine	Vyvanse	ADHD stimulant
Methylphenidate	Ritalin	ADHD stimulant
Methamphetamine	Desoxyn	Not used
MDMA	N/A	Limited use
Cocaine	Generic	Local anesthetic
Miscellaneous
Cannabis	Many, see cannabis in Australia	Many
GHB	N/A	Sedative
Ketamine	N/A	Dissociative anaesthetic, analgesic
Psilocybin	N/A	Limited use

=== Schedule 9: Prohibited Substance ===
Schedule 9 (S9) drugs and poisons are substances and preparations that, by law, may only be used for research purposes. The sale, distribution, use, and manufacture of such substances without a permit is strictly prohibited by law. Permits for research uses on humans must be approved by a recognised ethics committee on human research.

Examples:

- 2C-I
- Benzylpiperazine
- Bromo-DragonFLY
- Coca leaf
- DMT
- Harmine/Harmaline
- Heroin
- Kratom, also known as Mitragyna speciosa; as well its main alkaloid Mitragynine
- LSD
- MDPV
- Mephedrone
- Mescaline
- Methaqualone
- Methoxypiperamide
- Salvia divinorum

=== Schedule 10: Substances of such danger to health as to warrant prohibition of sale, supply and use ===
Schedule 10 was known as Appendix C until the introduction of the Poisons Standard 2015. It includes substances of such danger to health as to warrant prohibition of sale, supply and use. To clarify, the listed substances are not necessarily prohibited completely. Rather, it depends on the concentration of the substance and its associated risk for harm. To illustrate, diethylene glycol is prohibited by law, but at a concentration of 0.25% it is allowed to be an ingredient in toothpaste and mouthwash.

Examples are:

- 2,4-Dinitrophenol for human use
- Borage for therapeutic use except the fixed oil derived from the seeds of Borago officinalis.
- Coal tar for cosmetic use other than in therapeutic goods.
- Juniperus sabina for therapeutic use
- Oxyphenisatin for therapeutic use

=== Unscheduled substances ===
Unscheduled substances do not belong to any of the above schedules; these substances may still have restrictions in place from other legislation. Many of these preparations are also sold in supermarkets in addition to pharmacies.

Examples:

- Antacids
- Alcohol (ethanol)
- Caffeine
- Hydroxymorphinan
- Paracetamol 500 mg in small packs (<24; larger packs are schedule 2)
- Some laxatives (e.g. bulk laxatives Metamucil)
- Lubricant eye drops
- Nicotine replacement therapy (some preparations are schedule 2)

== Interstate variations ==
=== New South Wales ===
In New South Wales, poisons are proclaimed in the Poisons List by the Poisons Advisory Committee, under the authority of the Poisons and Therapeutic Goods Act 1966 (NSW). NSW legislation refers to S2 as "medicinal poisons", S3 as "potent substances", S4 as "restricted substances" and S8 as "drugs of addiction".

==== Schedule 3 Recordable ====
Schedule 3 Recordable (S3R), or "recordable potent substances", refers to Pharmacist Only Medicines where supply is recorded as for Schedule 4 drugs. S3R drugs are those that may have an increased risk of illegal diversion or abuse. These are specified in Clause 23 of the Poisons and Therapeutic Goods Regulation 2002 (NSW). As of January 2006, all pseudoephedrine-containing preparations are S3R. Rikodeine cough syrup also falls into category which contains Dihydrocodeine and Sorbitol.

==== Schedule 4 Appendix D ====
Schedule 4, Appendix D (S4D) refers to Prescription Only Medicines that do not have sufficient addictiveness or risk of abuse to be classified as S8, but for which a significant addiction/abuse risk exists. As such, S4D drugs are subject to additional prescription and recording requirements over S4. These drugs are referred to as "prescribed restricted substances" under the Poisons and Therapeutic Goods Regulation 2002 (NSW) and are listed in Appendix D of the Regulation. Drugs included in Appendix D include benzodiazepines, anabolic steroids, gabapentinoids and opiates. A subset of Appendix D are the Appendix B substances, which are subject to similar requirements as S8 drugs.

=== South Australia ===
==== Recordable S3 products (Schedule G) ====
In South Australia, supply of certain S3 preparations listed in Schedule G of the Controlled Substances (Poisons) Regulations 1996 (SA) are recordable under Regulation 14(2). As of 2006, Schedule G products specified are: adrenaline (in metered aerosols), dihydrocodeine (in cough preparations), doxylamine (in preparations also containing codeine), promethazine (in preparations also containing codeine), and pseudoephedrine.

=== Western Australia ===
==== Recordable S3 products (Appendix J) ====
In Western Australia, supply of certain S3 preparations listed in Appendix J of the Poisons Regulations 1965 (WA) are recordable under Regulation 35A. As of 2006, Appendix J products specified are: hydrocortisone, hydrocortisone acetate, pseudoephedrine, and nicotine preparations were included in Schedule 3.

== See also ==
- Regulation of therapeutic goods
- Prohibition of drugs
- Illicit drug use in Australia
