= Methylbenzylpiperazine =

Chemical compound

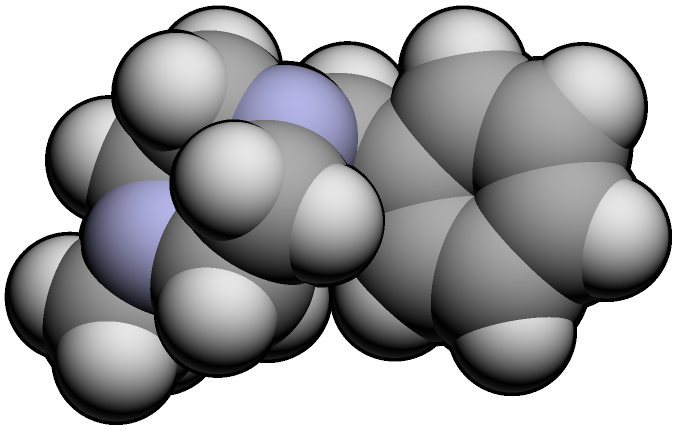

Clinical data
- Other names: 1-methyl-4-(phenylmethyl)piperazine; 1-methyl-4-benzylpiperazine
- Routes of administration: By mouth

Legal status
- Legal status: DE: Anlage II (Authorized trade only, not prescriptible); II-P(Poland)

Pharmacokinetic data
- Metabolism: liver
- Excretion: kidney

Identifiers
- IUPAC name: 1-benzyl-4-methylpiperazine
- CAS Number: 62226-74-8
- PubChem CID: 763557
- ChemSpider: 667589
- UNII: 4GD4YEE2WP
- CompTox Dashboard (EPA): DTXSID90354100
- ECHA InfoCard: 100.133.648

Chemical and physical data
- Formula: C_{12}H_{18}N_{2}
- Molar mass: 190.290 g·mol^{−1}
- 3D model (JSmol): Interactive image
- SMILES: CN1CCN(CC1)CC2=CC=CC=C2
- InChI: InChI=1S/C12H18N2/c1-13-7-9-14(10-8-13)11-12-5-3-2-4-6-12/h2-6H,7-11H2,1H3; Key:MLJOKPBESJWYGL-UHFFFAOYSA-N

Methylbenzylpiperazine (1-methyl-4-benzylpiperazine, MBZP) is a stimulant drug which is a derivative of benzylpiperazine. MBZP has been sold as an ingredient in legal recreational drugs known as "party pills", initially in New Zealand and subsequently in other countries around the world.

The effects of MBZP are very similar to those of benzylpiperazine (BZP), but the stimulant effect is slightly weaker and it seems to have less of a tendency to cause negative side effects such as headaches and nausea. It animals, it has adrenergic blocking activity.

Based on the recommendation of the EACD, the New Zealand government has passed legislation which placed BZP, along with the other piperazine derivatives TFMPP, mCPP, pFPP, MeOPP and MBZP, into Class C of the New Zealand Misuse of Drugs Act 1975. A ban was intended to come into effect in New Zealand on December 18, 2007, but the law change did not go through until the following year, and the sale of BZP and the other listed piperazines became illegal in New Zealand as of 1 April 2008. An amnesty for possession and usage of these drugs remained until October 2008, at which point they became completely illegal.

MBZP is classified as a class C drug in the UK.

In Canada MBZP remains unscheduled and uncontrolled as of January, 2015. It is not approved for any medical use but is legally available as a research chemical. MBZP is chemically closely related to the controlled Schedule III substance BZP but the latter's scheduling status shields most of its close derivatives from mandatory analogue laws which in Canada apply only to substances belonging to Schedule I under CDSA regulations, which comprises both explicitly illegal substances as well as legal drugs with the highest potential for abuse and dependence, most of which are listed as US Schedule II in the United States. Unlike the US however, stimulants widely used in the treatment of ADHD and narcolepsy in Canada are classified under Schedule III to avoid impractical administrative complications applied to the dispensing of Schedule I substances, a situation which could prompt some practitioners to abstain from dispensing the most proper treatment in order to avoid legal harassment and time-consuming record-keeping not directly related to patient care. BZP, whose abuse profile compared with ADHD treatment drugs is not documented enough to establish any correlation, nonetheless lacks the potency to qualify for Schedule I but was deemed a serious enough concern for control under Schedule III, allowing Health Canada to suspend its sale, but not that of its less potent derivatives, pending further assessment. MBZP remains uncontrolled in Canada as of 2015.

== See also ==
- 3-Methylbenzylpiperazine
- Substituted piperazine
