= Benzylpiperazine =

Recreational drug

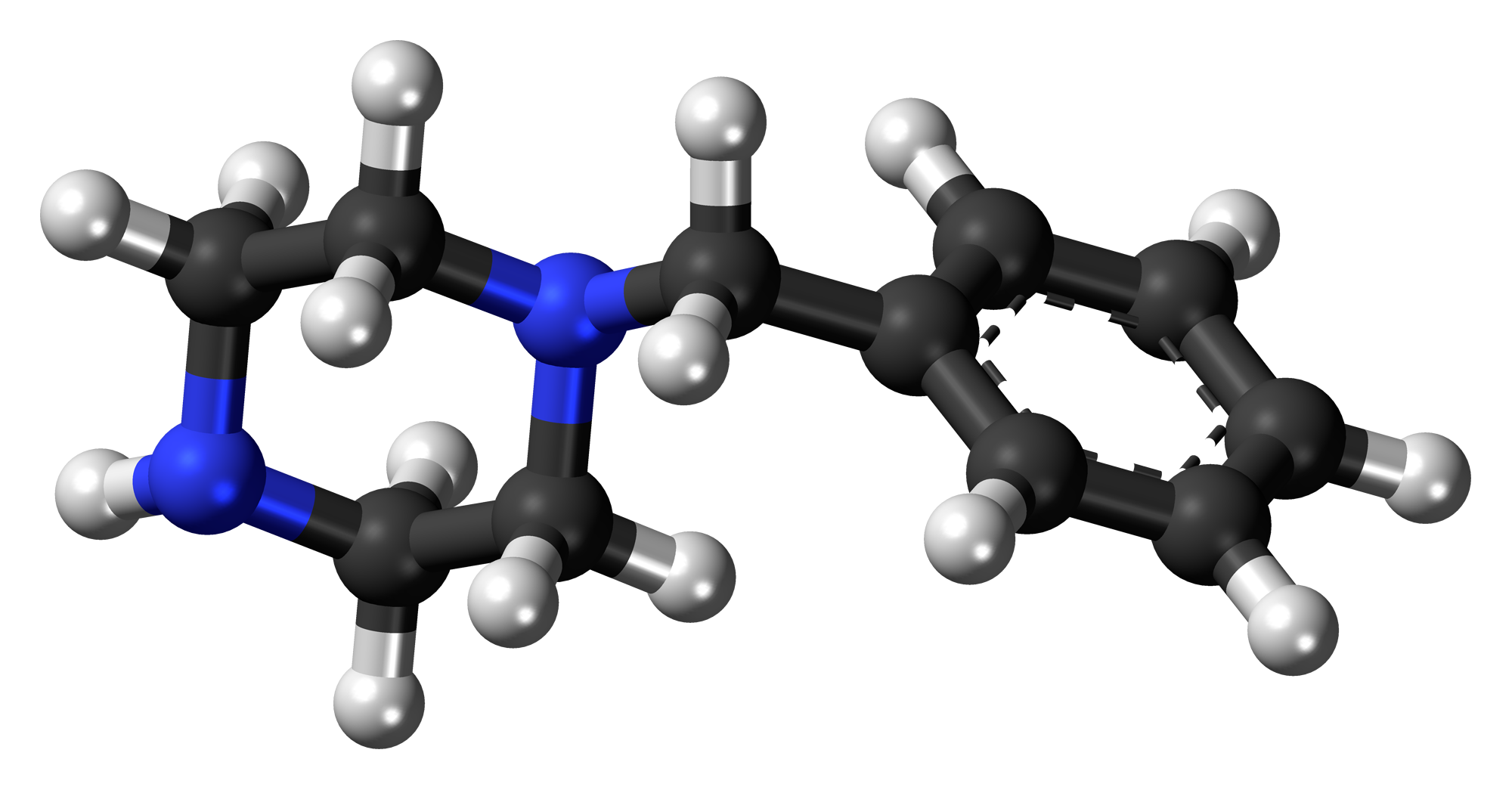

Clinical data
- Other names: BZP; 1-Benzylpiperazine; 1-BZP
- Routes of administration: Oral, intravenous, insufflation
- Drug class: Norepinephrine–dopamine releasing agent; Serotonin receptor agonist; Stimulant
- ATC code: None

Legal status
- Legal status: AU: S9 (Prohibited substance); BR: Class F2 (Prohibited psychotropics); CA: Schedule III; DE: Anlage II (Authorized trade only, not prescriptible); NZ: Class C; UK: POM (Prescription only); US: Schedule I

Pharmacokinetic data
- Bioavailability: Unknown
- Metabolism: Hepatic
- Elimination half-life: 5.5 Hours
- Excretion: Renal

Identifiers
- IUPAC name: 1-benzylpiperazine
- CAS Number: 2759-28-6
- PubChem CID: 75994
- ChemSpider: 68493
- UNII: 3UG152ZU0E
- KEGG: C22780
- ChEBI: CHEBI:83537
- ChEMBL: ChEMBL113600
- CompTox Dashboard (EPA): DTXSID0022197
- ECHA InfoCard: 100.018.567

Chemical and physical data
- Formula: C_{11}H_{16}N_{2}
- Molar mass: 176.263 g·mol^{−1}
- 3D model (JSmol): Interactive image
- SMILES: C1(CN2CCNCC2)=CC=CC=C1
- InChI: InChI=1S/C11H16N2/c1-2-4-11(5-3-1)10-13-8-6-12-7-9-13/h1-5,12H,6-10H2; Key:IQXXEPZFOOTTBA-UHFFFAOYSA-N

Benzylpiperazine (BZP), also known as 1-benzylpiperazine, is a substance often used as a recreational drug and is known to have euphoriant and stimulant properties. Several studies conducted between 2000 and 2011 found that the effects of BZP are similar to amphetamine, although BZP's dosage is roughly 10 times higher by weight.

Adverse effects have been reported following its use including acute psychosis, renal toxicity and seizures. Deaths from piperazine derivatives are extremely rare, but there has been at least one death apparently due to BZP alone. Its sale is banned in several countries, including Australia, Canada, New Zealand, the United States, the Republic of Ireland, the United Kingdom, Bulgaria, Romania and other parts of Europe.

== Use and effects ==
Pupil dilation from the effects of BZP.

The effects of BZP are largely similar to amphetamines, with one study finding that former amphetamine addicts were unable to distinguish between dextroamphetamine and BZP administered intravenously. A 2005 study has shown that mixtures of BZP with other piperazine drugs such as TFMPP share certain pharmacodynamic traits with MDMA.

=== Subjective effects ===
Upon ingestion of between 50 mg and 200 mg of BZP, the user may experience any or all of the following:

Initial effects:

- Feelings of euphoria, wonder, amazement, well-being, energy and elation
- Rapid mood elevation
- Enhanced sociability
- Enhanced appreciation of music
- Increased desire to move, also slight increase in stereotypy
- Skin tingling
- Decreased appetite
- Repetitive thought patterns
- Actual and perceived changes in body temperature
- Mild jaw clenching/bruxism
- Increased heart rate
- Dilation of pupils (see photo)
- Nausea
- Flushing
- Mild xerostomia (dry mouth)
- Slight urinary incontinence, often described as "leaking" a small amount of urine after urinating (not due to loss of bladder control)

Later effects:

- Mild headache
- Nausea
- Hangover-like symptoms (common with high doses)
- Fatigue
- Indigestion (similar to acid indigestion/heartburn)
- Increased hunger (and sometimes thirst)
- Insomnia
- Confusion
- Depression (particularly with frequent/heavy use)

== Adverse effects ==
=== Tolerance ===
Research into BZP's tolerance is sparse. Anecdotal evidence from online sources claim tolerance to the central action of BZP will develop quickly. Due to tiredness associated with the body's recovery from stimulants, such as BZP, it is uncommon for users to be able to sustain a week-long intake.

=== Toxic effects ===
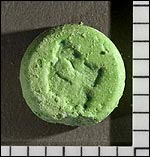
An impure 'ecstasy' tablet – seized by law enforcement in the United States – containing BZP, methamphetamine, and caffeine.

As with most sympathomimetic stimulants, significant side effects are associated with BZP use. It reportedly produces insomnia and a mild to severe hangover after the drug effect wears off. The majority of the toxic effects information came from a 2005 study that recorded all presentations associated with party pill use at the Emergency Department of Christchurch Hospital, New Zealand. Fourteen toxic seizures were recorded in two patients with life-threatening toxicity with status epilepticus and severe respiratory and metabolic acidosis. The results of this study and others like it showed that BZP can cause unpredictable and serious toxicity in some individuals, but the data and dosage collection were reliant on self reporting by drug users, which may result in under-reporting (or over-reporting), and there were complicating factors like the frequent presence of alcohol and other drugs.

The major side effects include dilated pupils, blurred vision, dryness of the mouth, extreme alertness, pruritus, confusion, agitation, tremor, extrapyramidal symptoms (dystonia, akathisia), headache, dizziness, anxiety, insomnia, vomiting, chest pain, hallucinations, paresthesia, tachycardia, hypertension, palpitations, collapse, hyperventilation, sweating, hyperthermia and problems with urine retention. The more severe toxic effects include psychosis or adverse psychiatric events, renal toxicity, respiratory failure, hyperthermia, serotonin syndrome, rhabdomyolysis and seizure. Blood benzylpiperazine concentrations have been measured either to confirm clinical intoxication or as part of a medicolegal death investigation.

=== Risk of fatality ===
Ingestion of piperazine derivatives alone rarely causes death. A retrospective study carried out at an Auckland emergency department found that BZP presentations only made a minor contribution to their overdose database, with most cases not producing any significant toxicity. One death has been attributed to ingestion of BZP alone; in this case its blood concentration was measured to be 8 mg/L.

Combined with alcohol or other illicit drugs, such as TFMPP and MDMA, multiple deaths have been reported. A combination of BZP and MDMA ingested by a 23-year-old DJ nearly resulted in death. He was put into an induced coma, and later recovered. In another case in Zürich in 2001, a 23-year-old who had taken BZP and MDMA died from a massive cerebral edema 57 hours after hospital admission.

=== Addictive effects ===
BZP has not been found to be physically addictive in humans. Most users of BZP say they could stop, but do not want to. Studies undertaken on animals have indicated that BZP can substitute for methamphetamine in addicted rats, although it is one-tenth as potent and produces correspondingly weaker addictive effects.

== Pharmacology ==
=== Pharmacodynamics ===
BZP has been shown to have a mixed mechanism of action, acting on the serotonergic and dopaminergic receptor systems in a similar fashion to MDMA. BZP has amphetamine-like actions on the serotonin reuptake transporter, which increase serotonin concentrations in the extracellular fluids surrounding the cell and thereby increasing activation of the surrounding serotonin receptors. BZP has a lower potency effect on the noradrenaline reuptake transporter and the dopamine reuptake transporter. BZP has a high affinity action at the alpha2-adrenoreceptor, it is an antagonist at the receptor, like yohimbine, which inhibits negative feedback, causing an increase in released noradrenaline. Another study lists 1-Benzylpiperazine (BZP)'s Release DAT, NET, and SERT EC_{50}s (i.e. a measure of potency for the release of neurotransmitters via BZP's affinity for the dopamine, norepinephrine, and serotonin transporters respectively--whereby those transporter are induced to shuttle neurotransmitters out of neurons and deposit them in the synaptic gap) as 175, 62, and 6050; for comparison, the values listed for d-amphetamine (25, 7, and 1765) and d-methamphetamine (25, 12, and 736) show a similar DAT:NET affinity ratio as well as minor SERT activity which suggests BZP possesses similar activity to the two aforementioned drugs (when dosed ~7x higher due to lower potency) rather than serotonergic substituted amphetamines like MDMA.

BZP also acts as a non-selective serotonin receptor agonist on a wide variety of serotonin receptors. Binding to 5-HT_{2A} receptors may explain its mild hallucinogenic effects at high doses, while partial agonist or antagonist effects at the 5-HT_{2B} receptors may explain some of BZPs peripheral side effects, as this receptor is expressed very densely in the gut, and binding to 5-HT_{3} receptors may explain the common side effect of headaches, as this receptor is known to be involved in the development of migraine headaches. However, in spite of the reported hallucinogenic effects of BZP at high doses, the drug does not produce the head-twitch response, a behavioral proxy of psychedelic effects, in rodents.

=== Pharmacokinetics ===
The pharmacokinetics of BZP have been studied.

== Chemistry ==
BZP is a piperazine derivative which comes as either the hydrochloride salt or a free base. The hydrochloride salt is a white solid while the base form is a slightly yellowish-green liquid. BZP base is corrosive and causes burns.

=== Derivatives ===
- Pharmaceuticals
  - Befuraline – Antidepressant
  - Bifeprunox – Antipsychotic
  - Buclizine – Antihistamine
  - Chlorbenzoxamine – Gastrointestinal agent
  - Fipexide – Nootropic
  - Imatinib – Anticancer agent
  - Meclozine – Antihistamine
  - Piberaline – Antidepressant
  - Piribedil – Antiparkinsonian agent
  - Trimetazidine – Antianginal
  - Vesnarinone – Cardiotonic
- Designer drugs
  - 3-Methylbenzylpiperazine
  - 4-Methyl-1-benzylpiperazine (MBZP)
  - 4-Bromo-2,5-dimethoxy-1-benzylpiperazine (2C-B-BZP)
  - 1,4-Dibenzylpiperazine (DBZP)
  - 3,4-Methylenedioxy-1-benzylpiperazine (MDBZP)

Diphenylmethylpiperazines are also similar to benzylpiperazines.

== History ==
=== Development history ===
BZP was first synthesized by Burroughs Wellcome & Company in 1944. It is often claimed that it was originally synthesized as a potential antihelminthic (anti-parasitic) agent for use in farm animals, but its synthesis is thought to predate their interest in piperazines as antihelminthics. Even so, the majority of the early work with the piperazines were investigations into their potential use as antihelminthics, with the earliest clinical trials in the literature relating to piperazine being articles in the British Medical Journal in the 1950s. It was discovered that BZP had side effects and was largely abandoned as a worm treatment. It next appears in the literature in the 1970s when it was investigated as a potential antidepressant medication, but rejected when research reported that BZP had amphetamine-like effects and was liable to abuse. The study suggested that BZP "should be placed under statutory control similar to those regulating the use of amphetamine".

=== Recreational history ===
In 1996, the United States Drug Enforcement Administration noted that it was being recreationally used in California. It also reported that BZP was being used as an adulterant in illicit drugs. In around 2000, its use increased worldwide, which was soon followed by legislative control in Europe and the United States. In New Zealand, it was initially legal, but was restricted in 2005 and later reclassified as Class C due to new evidence in 2008. It was widely used before its reclassification, and an estimated 5 million pills were sold in New Zealand in 2007. BZP, which is often mixed with TFMPP, has been claimed to be a safer alternative to other illicit street drugs. It is also used as an adulterant of or substitute for MDMA, which has similar effects, and is sometimes marketed as "ecstasy", a colloquial term for MDMA.

BZP has also been used and prohibited in horse racing and athletics.

== Society and culture ==
=== Recreational sale ===
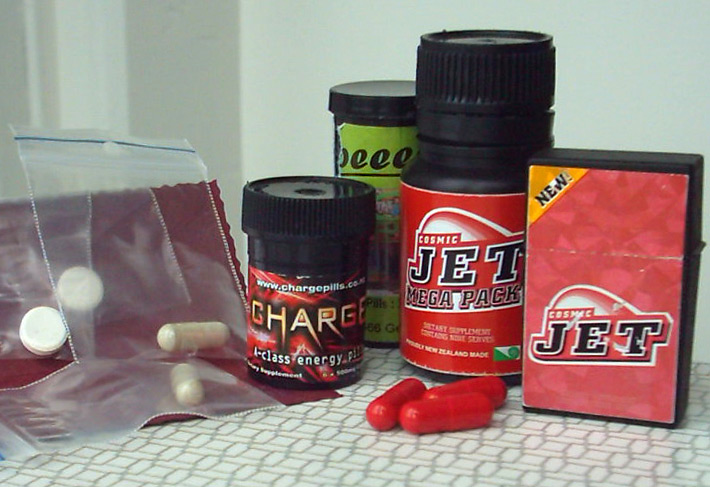
A selection of products containing BZP.

BZP is often marketed ostensibly as a "dietary supplement" to avoid meeting stricter laws that apply to medicines and drugs, despite the fact that BZP has no dietary value. As of late 2005, the Misuse of Drugs Act ensured it can no longer be classified or marketed as a dietary supplement in New Zealand. Some retailers claim that BZP is a "natural" product, describing it as a "pepper extract" or "herbal high," when in fact the drug is entirely synthetic, and has not been found to occur naturally.

=== Legal status ===
Map of benzylpiperazine legality worldwide Red: Prohibited Pink: European Union, requested prohibition Gray: Unknown

BZP is banned in Australia, Austria, Canada, Denmark, Estonia, France, Germany, Greece, Ireland, Italy, Japan, Malta, Poland, Sweden and the United States. BZP is not controlled under any UN convention, so the compounds themselves are legal throughout most of the world, although in most countries their use is restricted to pharmaceutical manufacturing and recreational use is unknown.

==== Australia ====
BZP is banned in all Australian states. Victoria, the last state in which it was legal, changed its classification on 1 September 2006, when BZP and piperazine analogs become illegal in the federal schedules, which are enacted by all Australian states and territories.

==== Canada ====
In Canada, Benzylpiperazine and salts of benzylpiperazine are classified as Schedule III controlled substances under the Controlled Drugs and Substances Act.

==== European Union ====
Benzylpiperazine was the subject of a European Monitoring Centre for Drugs and Drug Addiction (EMCDDA) risk assessment to determine to determine how to control it throughout the European Union. The risk assessment came about as the result of a joint Europol – EMCDDA report which concluded that BZP needs to be looked at in more detail. The report was published in June 2007, and concluded that the use of BZP can lead to medical problems even if the long effects are still unknown. Taking this concession as a basis, the European Commission asked the Council to place BZP under control of the UN Convention on Psychotropic Substances. On 4 March 2008, the EU requested countries to place BZP under control within a year.

==== Finland ====
Scheduled in "government decree on narcotic substances, preparations and plants" and is hence illegal.

==== New Zealand ====
Based on the recommendation of the EACD, the New Zealand government passed legislation which placed BZP, along with other piperazine derivatives (TFMPP, mCPP, pFPP, MeOPP, and MBZP), into Class C of the Misuse of Drugs Act 1975. A ban was intended to come into effect in New Zealand on 18 December 2007, but the law change did not go through until the following year, and the sale of BZP and the other listed piperazines became illegal in New Zealand as of 1 April 2008. An amnesty for possession and usage of these drugs was in effect until October 2008, at which point they became completely illegal.

==== United Kingdom ====
Piperazine and salts of piperazine are classified as Prescription Only Medicines in the UK. Any products containing salts of piperazine would be licensable under the Medicines Act and consequently anyone manufacturing and supplying it legally must hold the relevant licenses to do so. BZP is not a salt of piperazine, but mislabelling of BZP products as containing "piperazine blend" resulted in some prosecutions of suppliers in the UK by the Medicines and Healthcare Products Regulatory Agency, although none were successful. In May 2009, the Home Office announced plans to ban BZP, and launched a consultation on the proposal. In October 2009, it was announced that from 23 December 2009, BZP and related piperazines would be Class C drugs under the Misuse of Drugs Act.

==== United States ====
The drug was federally classified as a Schedule I controlled substance in the United States in 2002, following a report by the DEA which incorrectly stated that BZP was 10 to 20 times more potent than amphetamine, when in fact BZP is ten times less potent than dexamphetamine. It is also illegal at the state level in Florida, Oklahoma, Vermont, and Virginia.

== See also ==
- Substituted piperazine
