= Trifluoromethylphenylpiperazine =

Serotonergic drug

TFMPP

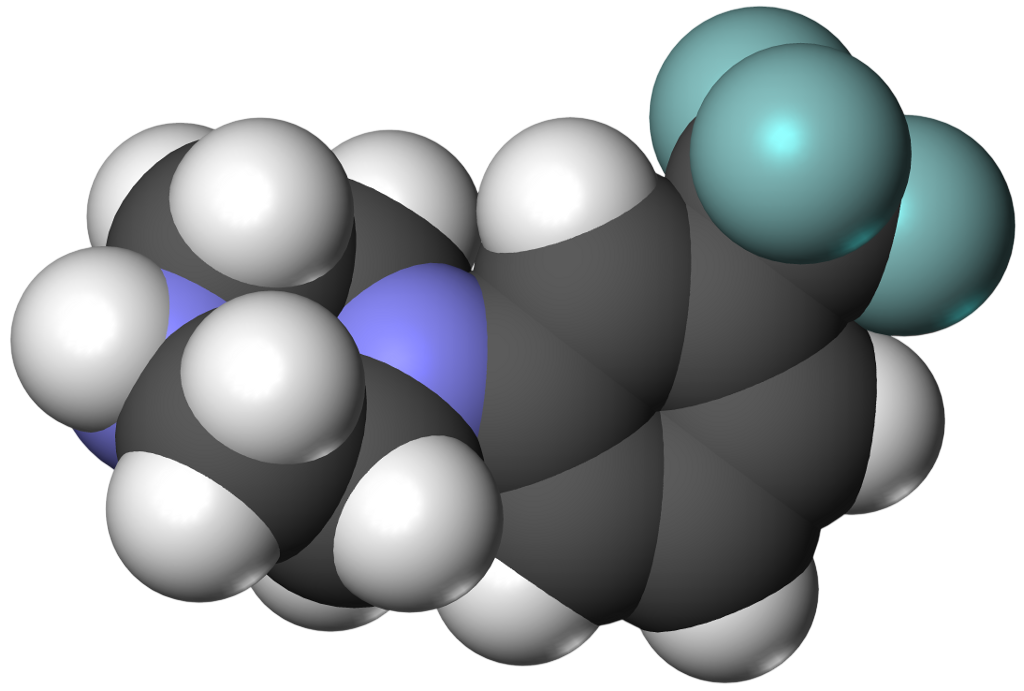

Clinical data
- Other names: m-Trifluoromethylphenylpiperazine; 3-Trifluoromethylphenylpiperazine; TFMPP; mTFMPP
- Routes of administration: Oral
- Drug class: Non-selective serotonin receptor agonist; Serotonin 5-HT_{1B} receptor agonist; Serotonin 5-HT_{2A} receptor agonist; Serotonin 5-HT_{2C} receptor agonist; Serotonin releasing agent
- ATC code: None

Legal status
- Legal status: AU: S9 (Prohibited substance); BR: Class F2 (Prohibited psychotropics); CA: Schedule III; DE: Anlage II (Authorized trade only, not prescriptible); NZ: Class C; US: Scheduled in Florida; Unscheduled Federally; II-P (Poland)

Pharmacokinetic data
- Metabolism: Liver; CYP2D6, CYP1A2, CYP3A4

Identifiers
- IUPAC name: 1-[3-(trifluoromethyl)phenyl]piperazine
- CAS Number: 15532-75-9
- PubChem CID: 4296
- ChemSpider: 4145
- UNII: 25R3ONU51C
- KEGG: C22745
- ChEBI: CHEBI:83536
- CompTox Dashboard (EPA): DTXSID10165876
- ECHA InfoCard: 100.035.962

Chemical and physical data
- Formula: C_{11}H_{13}F_{3}N_{2}
- Molar mass: 230.234 g·mol^{−1}
- 3D model (JSmol): Interactive image
- SMILES: FC(F)(F)C1=CC(N2CCNCC2)=CC=C1
- InChI: InChI=1S/C11H13F3N2/c12-11(13,14)9-3-1-2-4-10(9)16-7-5-15-6-8-16/h1-4,15H,5-8H2; Key:VZUBMIDXJRGARE-UHFFFAOYSA-N

meta-Trifluoromethylphenylpiperazine (TFMPP) is a recreational drug of the phenylpiperazine chemical class and is a substituted piperazine. Usually in combination with benzylpiperazine (BZP) and other analogues, it is sold as an alternative to the illicit drug MDMA ("Ecstasy").

== Use and effects ==
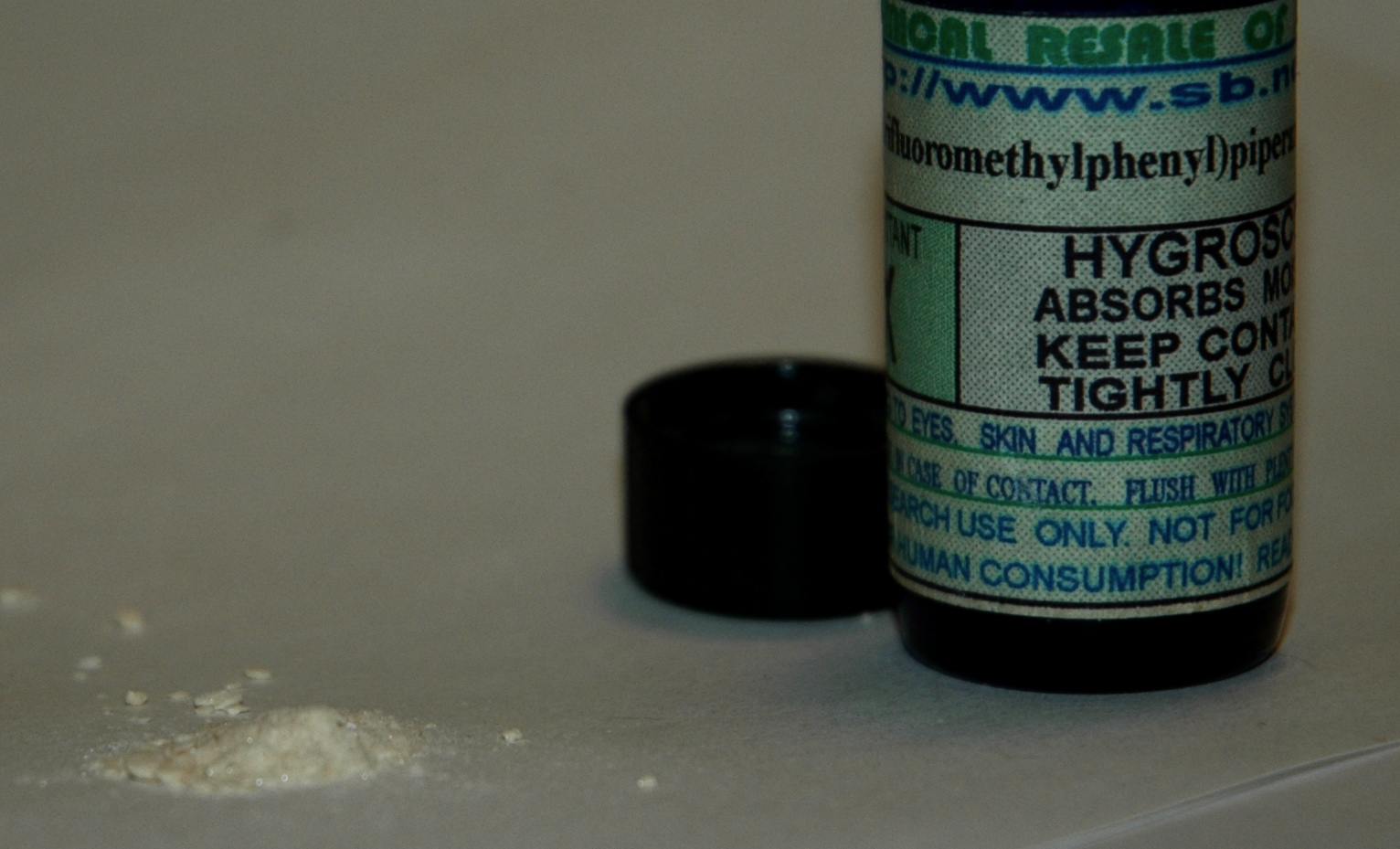
TFMPP is off-white, yellowish in color.

TFMPP is rarely used by itself. In fact, TFMPP reduces locomotor activity and produces aversive effects in animals rather than self-administration, which may explain the decision of the DEA not to permanently make TFMPP a controlled substance. More commonly, TFMPP is co-administered with BZP, which acts as a norepinephrine and dopamine releasing agent. Due to the serotonin agonist effects and increase in serotonin, norepinephrine, and dopamine levels produced by the BZP/TFMPP combination, this mixture of drugs produces effects which crudely mimic those of MDMA.

In clinical studies, TFMPP produced effects in humans including dysphoria, dextroamphetamine-like effects (i.e., stimulant-like effects), tension and anxiety, mental confusion and "bewilderment", and increased ratings of "drug liking", "high", and "stimulated". The drug has been anecdotally reported to produce mild psychedelic effects in humans, but no hallucinogenic effects with the drug were described in clinical studies at the employed dose. The combination of TFMPP with BZP crudely mimics the effects of MDMA in clinical studies.

== Side effects ==
The combination of BZP and TFMPP has been associated with a range of side effects, including insomnia, anxiety, nausea and vomiting, headaches and muscle aches which may resemble migraine, seizures, impotence, and rarely psychosis, as well as a prolonged and unpleasant hangover effect. These side effects tend to be significantly worsened when the BZP/TFMPP mix is consumed alongside alcohol, especially the headache, nausea, and hangover.

However, it is difficult to say how many of these side effects are produced by TFMPP itself, as it has rarely been marketed without BZP also being present, and all of the side effects mentioned are also produced by BZP (which has been sold as a single drug). Studies into other related piperazine drugs such as mCPP suggest that certain side effects such as anxiety, headache and nausea are common to all drugs of this class, and pills containing TFMPP are reported by users to produce comparatively more severe hangover effects than those containing only BZP. The drug can also cause the body to tremble for a long period of time.

== Pharmacology ==
=== Pharmacodynamics ===
4-HO-TFMPP is a metabolite of TFMPP.

TFMPP has affinity for the 5-HT_{1A} (K_{i} = 288–1,950 nM), 5-HT_{1B} (K_{i} = 30–132 nM), 5-HT_{1D} (K_{i} = 282 nM), 5-HT_{2A} (K_{i} = 160–269 nM), and 5-HT_{2C} (K_{i} = 62 nM) receptors, and functions as a full agonist at all sites except the 5-HT_{2A} receptor, where it acts as a weak partial agonist or antagonist. Unlike the related piperazine compound meta-chlorophenylpiperazine (mCPP), TFMPP has insignificant affinity for the 5-HT_{3} receptor (IC_{50} = 2,373 nM). TFMPP also binds to the SERT (EC_{50} = 121 nM) and evokes the release of serotonin. It has no effects on dopamine or norepinephrine reuptake or efflux.

Findings are mixed on whether TFMPP produces the head-twitch response, a behavioral proxy of psychedelic effects, in rodents, with some studies finding that it does and others reporting that it does not. In one study, TFMPP did not produce the head-twitch response on its own, but when combined with the selective serotonin 5-HT_{2C} receptor antagonist SB-242084, it was able to dose-dependently induce head twitches. In contrast to the preceding findings, the drug has been found to dose-dependently antagonize the head-twitch response induced by serotonergic psychedelics like DOI. The preceding findings suggest that serotonin 5-HT_{2C} receptor activation inhibits and can mask the head-twitch response induced by serotonin 5-HT_{2A} receptor agonists.

TFMPP has been found to reduce aggression in rodents. TFMPP was not self-administered by rhesus monkeys, suggesting that it lacks reinforcing effects.

=== Pharmacokinetics ===
The pharmacokinetics of TFMPP have been studied.

== Chemistry ==
=== Synthesis ===
The chemical synthesis of TFMPP has been described.

=== Derivatives ===
- Antrafenine
- CPD-1

== History ==
TFMPP was first described in the scientific literature in 1978.

== Society and culture ==
=== Legal status ===
==== Canada ====
Since 2012, TFMPP has been listed as a Schedule III controlled substance in Canada, making possession of TFMPP a federal offence. It has also been added to Part J of the Food and Drug Regulations thereby prohibiting the production, export or import of the substance.

==== China ====
As of October 2015 TFMPP is a controlled substance in China.

==== Denmark ====
As of December 3, 2005, TFMPP is illegal in Denmark.

==== Finland ====
Scheduled in government decree on psychoactive substances banned from the consumer market.

==== Japan ====
Since 2003, TFMPP and BZP became illegal in Japan.

==== Netherlands ====
TFMPP is unscheduled in the Netherlands.

==== New Zealand ====
Based on the recommendation of the EACD, the New Zealand government has passed legislation which placed BZP, along with the other piperazine derivatives TFMPP, mCPP, pFPP, MeOPP and MBZP, into Class C of the New Zealand Misuse of Drugs Act 1975. A ban was intended to come into effect in New Zealand on December 18, 2007, but the law change did not go through until the following year, and the sale of BZP and the other listed piperazines became illegal in New Zealand as of 1 April 2008. An amnesty for possession and usage of these drugs remained until October 2008, at which point they became completely illegal.

==== Sweden ====
As of March 1, 2006, TFMPP is scheduled as a "dangerous substance" in Sweden.

==== Switzerland ====
As of December 1, 2010, TFMPP is a controlled substance in Switzerland.

==== United Kingdom ====
As of December 2009, TFMPP has been made a Class C drug in the United Kingdom along with BZP.

==== United States ====
TFMPP is not currently scheduled at the federal level in the United States, but it was briefly emergency scheduled in Schedule I. The scheduling expired in April 2004 and was not renewed. However, some states such as Florida have banned the drug in their criminal statutes making its possession a felony.

===== Florida =====
TFMPP is a Schedule I controlled substance in the state of Florida making it illegal to buy, sell, or possess in Florida.

===== Texas =====
TFMPP is controlled in Texas under Penalty Group 2, as a hallucinogenic substance. It is illegal to possess TFMPP in any quantity in Texas.

== See also ==
- Substituted piperazine
