= List of psychotropic medications =

This is a list of psychotropic medications that are currently being marketed, alphabetized by brand name.

List in construction (October 2026)

== A ==
- Abilify (aripiprazole) – atypical antipsychotic used to treat schizophrenia, bipolar disorder, and irritability associated with autism
- Adderall (mixed amphetamine salts) – a stimulant used to treat ADHD
- Ambien (zolpidem) – nonbenzodiazepine used as a sleep aid
- Anafranil (clomipramine) – a tricyclic antidepressant; mostly used to treat OCD
- Anquil (benperidol) – an antipsychotic primarily used to control antisocial hypersexual behaviour
- Antabuse (disulfiram) – inhibits the enzyme acetaldehyde dehydrogenase, causing acetaldehyde poisoning when ethanol is consumed; used to cause severe hangover when drinking; increases liver, kidney, and brain damage from drinking
- Aponal, Quitaxon, Sinequan (doxepin) – a tricyclic antidepressant used to treat nerve pain, insomnia; similar to imipramine
- Aricept (donepezil) – used to slow the progression of Alzheimer's disease
- Asendin (amoxapine) – an dibenzoxazepine antidepressant
- Athymil (mianserin) – a tetracyclic antidepressant; used off-label as a sleep aid
- Ativan (lorazepam) – a benzodiazepine, used to treat anxiety and agitation
- Auvelity (Dextromethorphan/bupropion) – a combination of a NMDA antagonist and Norepinephrine–dopamine reuptake inhibitor used to treat Major depressive disorder as well as agitation associated with Dementia due to Alzheimer's disease
- Azstarys (Serdexmethylphenidate/Dexmethylphenidate) - a long-acting CNS stimulant used to treat ADHD

== B ==
- Belsomra (Suvorexant) – used to treat insomnia
- Buspar (buspirone) – an anxiolytic used to treat generalized anxiety disorder
- Belbuca (buprenorphine) – a long acting partial opioid agonist that is used to treat chronic pain conditions

== C ==
- Campral (Acamprosate) – used in the management of alcohol dependence
- Celexa (citalopram) – an antidepressant of the SSRI class
- Centrax (prazepam) – an anti-anxiety agent
- Clozaril (clozapine) – atypical antipsychotic used to treat resistant schizophrenia
- Cobenfy (Xanomeline/Trospium Chloride) – atypical antipsychotic combination (Central Muscarinic agonist/Peripheral selective Muscarinic antagonist)
- Concerta (methylphenidate) – an extended release form of methylphenidate
- Contrave (naltrexone/bupropion) – a combination drug used in the treatment of mood and psychotic disorders. It is also approved for weight loss in those that are either obese or overweight with some weight-related illnesses
- Cymbalta (duloxetine) – an antidepressant of the serotonin-norepinephrine reuptake inhibitors class

== D ==
- Depakote (valproic acid/sodium valproate) – an antiepileptic and mood stabilizer used to treat bipolar disorder, neuropathic pain and others; sometimes called an antimanic medication. Depakene is the trade name for the same drug prepared without sodium. It is available both extended Release and Delayed Release.
- Desyrel (trazodone) – an atypical antidepressant used to treat depression and insomnia
- Desoxyn (methamphetamine hydrochloride) – used to treat attention deficit hyperactivity disorder and exogenous obesity
- Dexedrine (dextroamphetamine sulfate) – used to treat attention deficit hyperactivity disorder and narcolepsy

== E ==
- Effexor and Effexor XR (venlafaxine) – an antidepressant of the SNRI class
- Elavil (amitriptyline) – a tricyclic antidepressant used as a first-line treatment for neuropathic pain
- Eurodin, Prosom (estazolam) – a benzodiazepine derivative with anxiolytic, anticonvulsant, hypnotic, sedative and skeletal muscle relaxant properties, commonly prescribed for short-term treatment of insomnia

== F ==
- Fetzima (levomilnacipran) – an antidepressant of the SNRI class
- Frisium, Onfi, Tapclob, Urbanol (clobazam) – a benzodiazepine that has been marketed as an anxiolytic since 1975 and as an anticonvulsant since 1984
- Focalin (Dexmethylphenidate) – a NDRI stimulant used to treat ADHD it is available both extended Release and Immediate Release. D-enantiomer of Methylphenidate
- Fycompa (perampanel) – an anti-epileptic medication which can cause serious psychiatric and behavioral changes

== G ==
- Geodon (ziprasidone) – atypical antipsychotic used to treat schizophrenia and bipolar mania
- Gabitril (tiagabine) – used off-label in the treatment of anxiety disorders and panic disorder
- Gocovri (Amantadine) – a dopaminergic antiparkinsonian and weak NMDA antagonist

== H ==
- Haldol (haloperidol) – typical antipsychotic

== I ==
- Imovane (zopiclone) – a non-benzodiazepine hypnotic
- Inderal (propranolol) – a beta blocker; it is used for acute anxiety, panic attacks, and hypertension
- Intuniv (Guanfacine) - an extended release, non-stimulant alpha-2 adrenergic agonist used to treat attention deficit hyperactivity disorder. Available in instant-release under the brand-name Tenex.
- Invega (paliperidone) – atypical antipsychotic used to treat schizophrenia and schizoaffective disorder

== K ==
- Keppra (levetiracetam) – an anticonvulsant drug which is sometimes used as a mood stabilizer and has potential benefits for other psychiatric and neurologic conditions such as Tourette syndrome, anxiety disorder, and Alzheimer's disease
- Klonopin (clonazepam) – anti-anxiety and anti-epileptic medication of the benzodiazepine class

== L ==
- Lamictal (lamotrigine) – an anticonvulsant used as a mood stabilizer
- Latuda (lurasidone) – an atypical antipsychotic
- Lexapro (escitalopram) – an antidepressant of the SSRI class
- Librium (chlordiazepoxide) – a benzodiazepine used to treat acute alcohol withdrawal
- Lithobid, Eskalith (lithium) – a mood stabilizer
- Loxam (escitalopram) – an antidepressant of the SSRI class
- Lunesta (eszopiclone) – a non-benzodiazepine hypnotic
- Luminal (phenobarbital) – a barbiturate with sedative and hypnotic properties
- Luvox (fluvoxamine) – an antidepressant of the SSRI class
- Loxitane (loxapine) – an antipsychotic used in the treatment of mood disorders and schizophrenia
- Lyrica (pregabalin) – an anticonvulsant gabapentinoid used to treat neuropathic pain and muscle pain, including fibromyalgia.

== M ==
- Melatonin – a hypnotic used to treat insomnia
- Minipress (prazosin) – atypical psychotropic used to treat PTSD
- Memantine (Namenda) - treats Dementia and Alzheimer's.
- Methadone (Dolophine, Methadose) - a synthetic opioid and potent NMDA antagonist; used to treat Opioid use disorder and neuropathic pain

== N ==
- Neurontin (gabapentin) – an anticonvulsant which is sometimes used as a mood stabilizer, anti-anxiety agent or to treat chronic pain, particularly diabetic neuropathy
- Norapramin (desipramine) – an antidepressant, also used in the treatment of nerve pain
- Nuplazid (pimavanserin) – an antipsychotic used to treat hallucinations and delusions caused by psychosis related to Parkinson's disease

== O ==
Orap (Pimozide) – a typical antipsychotic used to treat tic disorder

== P ==
- Pamelor (nortryptiline) – a tricyclic antidepressant
- Parnate (tranylcypromine) - a monoamine oxidase inhibitor (MAOI) used in the treatment of depression
- Paxil (paroxetine) – an antidepressant of the SSRI class
- Nardil (Phenelzine) – an antidepressant of the MAOI class used to treat depression
- Pristiq (desvenlafaxine) – an antidepressant of the SNRI class
- Prolixin (fluphenazine) – typical antipsychotic
- Provigil (modafinil) - used to treat excessive sleepiness and narcolepsy
- Prozac (fluoxetine) – an antidepressant of the SSRI class

== Q ==
- Quelbree (Viloxazine) – a Norepinephrine reuptake inhibitor, formerly used as an antidepressant and repurposed to treat ADHD
- Quviviq (Daridorexant) – an orexin receptor antagonist used as an hypnotic

== R ==
- Remeron (mirtazapine) – an tetracyclic antidepressant, used off-label as a sleep aid
- Restoril (temazepam) – a benzodiazepine used to treat insomnia
- Risperdal (risperidone) – atypical antipsychotic used to treat schizophrenia, bipolar disorder and irritability associated with autism
- Ritalin (methylphenidate) – a stimulant used to treat ADHD it is available both extended Release and Immediate Release.
- ReVia (naltrexone) – an opioid antagonist primarily used in the management of alcohol dependence, opioid dependence or other impulse control/addictive behaviors such as habitual self-mutilation
- Rexulti (brexpiprazole) – atypical antipsychotic used to treat mood and psychotic disorders

== S ==
- Saphris (asenapine) – atypical antipsychotic used to treat schizophrenia and bipolar disorder
- Savella (Milnacipran) – an antidepressant of the SNRI class; Approved to treat Fibromyalgia in US/Approved for MDD in EU
- Serax (oxazepam) – anti-anxiety medication of the benzodiazepine class, often used to help during detoxification from alcohol or other addictive substances
- Serentil (mesoridazine) – an antipsychotic drug used in the treatment of schizophrenia
- Seroquel and Seroquel XR (quetiapine) – atypical antipsychotic used to treat schizophrenia and bipolar disorder. Used off-label to treat insomnia
- Simtriyo (Centanafadine) – a Serotonin-norepinephrine-dopamine reuptake inhibitor used to treat ADHD
- Sonata (zaleplon) – a non-benzodiazepine hypnotic
- Spravato (esketamine) – a rapid-acting antidepressant of the NMDA receptor antagonist class; enantiomer of ketamine
- Stelazine (trifluoperazine) – an antipsychotic used in the treatment of psychotic disorders, anxiety, and nausea caused by chemotherapy
- Strattera (atomoxetine) – a non-stimulant medication used to treat ADHD
- Suboxone (buprenorphine/naloxone) - a partial opioid agonist used in the treatment of opioid use disorder; combined with an opioid antagonist to reduce misuse

== T ==
- Thorazine (chlorpromazine) – a phenothiazine antipsychotic used to treat schizophrenia, bipolar mania, and behavioral disorders in children. Notably, the first antipsychotic
- Tofranil (imipramine) – a tricyclic antidepressant used to treat depression, anxiety, agitation, panic disorder and bedwetting
- Topamax (topiramate) – an anticonvulsant used to treat epilepsy and migraine headaches
- Trileptal (oxcarbazepine) – an anticonvulsant used as a mood stabilizer
- Trintellix (vortioxetine) – an antidepressant of the serotonin modulator and stimulator class
- Tegretol (carbamazepine) – an anticonvulsant used as a mood stabilizer
- Trilafon (perphenazine)- an antipsychotic used to treat schizophrenia
- Tranxene, Novo-Clopate (clorazepate) – a benzodiazepine with anxiolytic, anticonvulsant, sedative, hypnotic, and skeletal muscle relaxant properties

== V ==
- Valium (diazepam) – a benzodiazepine used to treat anxiety.
- Vistaril (hydroxyzine) – an antihistamine for the treatment of itches and irritations, an antiemetic, as a weak analgesic, an opioid potentiator, and as an anxiolytic
- Vyvanse (lisdexamfetamine) – a pro-drug stimulant used to treat attention deficit hyperactivity disorder and binge eating disorder; Vyvanse is converted into Dexedrine in vivo
- Viibryd (vilazodone) – an antidepressant of the serotonin modulator and stimulators class
- Vivactil (protriptyline) an antidepressant also used in the treatment of nerve pain
- Vraylar (cariprazine) – atypical antipsychotic used to treat schizophrenia and bipolar mania

== W ==
- Wellbutrin IR, SR or XL (bupropion) – an antidepressant of the norepinephrine-dopamine reuptake inhibitor class, used to treat depression and seasonal affective disorder

== X ==
- Xanax (alprazolam) – a benzodiazepine used to treat anxiety

== Z ==
- Zoloft (sertraline) – an antidepressant of the SSRI class
- Zonegran (zonisamide) – an anticonvulsant used to treat other seizures
- Zulresso (brexanolone) – a GABA modulator antidepressant
- Zyban (bupropion) – same active ingredient as Wellbutrin, but marketed as a smoking cessation aid
- Zyprexa (olanzapine) – atypical antipsychotic used to treat schizophrenia and bipolar disorder

== See also ==
- List of psychiatric medications
- List of psychiatric drugs by type
- List of psychiatric medications by condition treated
