= List of psychiatric drugs by type =

This is a list of psychiatric drugs by type, with psychiatric drugs being drugs that are used to treat psychiatric disorders such as depression and anxiety. Among the most major classes of psychiatric drugs include antidepressants, anxiolytics, antipsychotics, mood stabilizers, and stimulants.

This list does not specifically include drugs used to treat appetite or sleep disorders, including appetite suppressants, appetite stimulants, hypnotics, and wakefulness-promoting agents, unless they are incidentally also used to treat other psychiatric disorders.

== Antidepressants ==
- Selective serotonin reuptake inhibitors (SSRIs) (e.g., escitalopram, fluoxetine, paroxetine, sertraline)
- Serotonin–norepinephrine reuptake inhibitors (SNRIs) (e.g., duloxetine, venlafaxine, levomilnacipran)
- Tricyclic antidepressants (TCAs) (e.g., amitriptyline, clomipramine, imipramine)
- Tetracyclic antidepressants (TeCAs) (e.g., mirtazapine, mianserin)
- Monoamine oxidase inhibitors (MAOIs) (e.g., phenelzine, tranylcypromine, moclobemide, selegiline)
- Serotonin antagonists and reuptake inhibitors (SARIs) (e.g., trazodone, nefazodone)
- Serotonin modulators and stimulators (SMSs) (e.g., vilazodone, vortioxetine)
- Norepinephrine reuptake inhibitors (NRIs) (e.g., reboxetine)
- Norepinephrine–dopamine reuptake inhibitors (NDRIs) (e.g., bupropion, amineptine, nomifensine)
- Serotonin 5-HT_{1A} receptor agonists (e.g., gepirone, tandospirone)
- Neurosteroid-type GABA_{A} receptor positive allosteric modulators (e.g., brexanolone, zuranolone)
- NMDA receptor antagonists (dissociative hallucinogens) (e.g., ketamine, esketamine)
- Psychedelics (serotonin 5-HT_{2A} receptor agonists) (e.g., psilocybin, LSD)
- Others (e.g., agomelatine, tianeptine, dextromethorphan/bupropion)

== Anxiolytics ==
- Selective serotonin reuptake inhibitors (SSRIs) (e.g., escitalopram, fluoxetine, paroxetine, sertraline)
- Serotonin 5-HT_{1A} receptor agonists (e.g., buspirone, tandospirone)
- Benzodiazepines (GABA_{A} receptor positive allosteric modulators) (e.g., diazepam, clonazepam, alprazolam, lorazepam)
- Nonbenzodiazepines (GABA_{A} receptor positive allosteric modulators) (e.g., alpidem, etifoxine)
- Gabapentinoids (α_{2}δ voltage-gated calcium channel modulators) (e.g., pregabalin, phenibut)
- Beta blockers (β-adrenergic receptor antagonists) (e.g., propranolol)

== Antipsychotics ==
- Typical antipsychotics (e.g., chlorpromazine, haloperidol)
- Atypical antipsychotics (e.g., clozapine, olanzapine, quetiapine, risperidone)
- Third-generation antipsychotics (e.g., aripiprazole, brexpiprazole, cariprazine)
- Serotonin 5-HT_{2A} receptor antagonists (e.g., pimavanserin)
- Muscarinic acetylcholine receptor agonists (e.g., xanomeline/trospium chloride)

== Mood stabilizers and anti-manic drugs ==
- Lithium salts (e.g., lithium carbonate, lithium citrate, lithium sulfate)
- Anticonvulsants (e.g., valproic acid, lamotrigine, carbamazepine)
- Antipsychotics (e.g., aripiprazole, haloperidol, olanzapine, quetiapine, risperidone)

== Stimulants, other ADHD drugs, and related ==
- Norepinephrine–dopamine releasing agents (NDRAs) (e.g., amphetamine, lisdexamfetamine, methamphetamine)
- Norepinephrine–dopamine reuptake inhibitors (NDRIs) (e.g., methylphenidate, centanafadine)
- Norepinephrine reuptake inhibitors (NRIs) (e.g., atomoxetine, viloxazine, desipramine)
- Serotonin–norepinephrine–dopamine reuptake inhibitor (SNDRI) (e.g., centanafadine)
- α_{2}-Adrenergic receptor agonists (e.g., guanfacine, clonidine)
- Others (e.g., bupropion, modafinil, armodafinil, selegiline)

== Antiaggressive and anti-agitation drugs ==
- Antipsychotics (e.g., aripiprazole, haloperidol, olanzapine, risperidone)
- Benzodiazepines (GABA_{A} receptor positive allosteric modulators) (e.g., diazepam, lorazepam, midazolam)
- α_{2}-Adrenergic receptor agonists (e.g., dexmedetomidine, clonidine)
- Dissociative anesthetics (NMDA receptor antagonists) (e.g., ketamine)
- Others (e.g., dextromethorphan/bupropion, anticonvulsants/mood stabilizers, cannabinoids)

== Antiobsessional drugs ==
- Serotonin reuptake inhibitors (SRIs) (e.g., escitalopram, fluoxetine, paroxetine, sertraline, clomipramine)

== Anti-addictive drugs ==
- Alcohol replacement therapy (e.g., baclofen, sodium oxybate, benzodiazepines)
- Disulfiram-like drugs (e.g., disulfiram, calcium carbimide, cyanamide)
- Nicotinic acetylcholine receptor modulators (e.g., nicotine, cytisinicline, varenicline, bupropion)
- Opioid receptor modulators (e.g., naltrexone, nalmefene)
- Opioid replacement therapy (e.g., methadone, buprenorphine)
- Others (e.g., acamprosate, ibogaine)

== Pro-sexual drugs ==
- Melanocortin receptor agonists (e.g., bremelanotide)
- Serotonin 5-HT_{1A} receptor agonists (e.g., flibanserin)
- Androgens (androgen receptor agonists) (e.g., testosterone, prasterone (DHEA), tibolone)
- Others (e.g., bupropion, cyproheptadine, selegiline, trazodone)

== Anti-sexual drugs ==
- Antigonadotropins or chemical castration (e.g., estrogens, progestogens, GnRH modulators)
- Antipsychotics (dopamine receptor antagonists) (e.g., haloperidol)
- Serotonin reuptake inhibitors (SRIs) (e.g., escitalopram, fluoxetine, paroxetine, sertraline, clomipramine)

== Fear memory modulators ==
- Fear consolidation disruptors (e.g., glucocorticoids like hydrocortisone)
- Fear extinction enhancers (e.g., cycloserine, propranolol, glucocorticoids, levodopa, histone deacetylase inhibitors, MDMA, psychedelics)

== Hallucinogens and entactogens ==
- Dissociatives (NMDA receptor antagonists) (e.g., ketamine, esketamine)
- Entactogens (serotonin releasing agents) (e.g., MDMA)
- Oneirogens (unknown mechanism) (e.g., ibogaine)
- Psychedelics (serotonin 5-HT_{2A} receptor agonists) (e.g., psilocybin, LSD)

== See also ==
- List of psychiatric medications
- List of psychotropic medications
- List of psychiatric medications by condition treated
- List of psychoactive drugs
