= List of psychiatric medications by condition treated =

This is a list of psychiatric medications used by psychiatrists and other physicians to treat mental illness or distress.

The list is ordered alphabetically according to the condition or conditions, then by the generic name of each medication. The list is not exhaustive and not all drugs are used regularly in all countries. Some medications treat multiple conditions and appear multiple times.

== Drug Dependence Therapy ==
=== Used in the treatment of alcoholism and opioid dependence ===
INN	Common brand names
Acamprosate	Campral
Baclofen	Baclosan, Kemstro, Lioresal
Buprenorphine	Subutex
Buprenorphine + Naloxone	Suboxone
Clonidine	Catapres, Kapvay, Nexiclon
Disulfiram	Antabuse
Methadone	Dolophine
Nalmefene	Selincro
Naltrexone	Depade, ReVia, Vivitrol
Ondansetron	Zofran
Topiramate	Topamax

=== Used for smoking cessation ===
INN	Common brand names
Bupropion	Voxra, Zyban
Cytisine	Tabex, Desmoxan
Varenicline	Champix, Chantix

== Attention Deficit Hyperactivity Disorder ==
=== Stimulants ===
INN	Common brand names
Amphetamine	Evekeo, Evekeo-ODT
Amphetamine + Dexamfetamine	Adderall, Adzenys, Dyanavel, Mydayis
Dexamfetamine	Dexedrine, Dextrostat, Zenzedi, Xelstrym
Lisdexamfetamine	Vyvanse, Elvanse
Methylphenidate	Ritalin, Ritalin LA, Concerta
Dexmethylphenidate	Focalin, Focalin XR
Methamphetamine	Desoxyn

=== Non-Stimulant Medications ===
INN	Common brand names
Atomoxetine	Strattera
Viloxazine	Qelbree
Bupropion	Wellbutrin
Clonidine	Kapvay
Guanfacine	Intuniv, Tenex
Modafinil	Provigil, Alertec, Modavigil
Armodafinil	Nuvigil

== Anxiety Disorders ==
=== Benzodiazepines ===
INN	Common brand names
Alprazolam	Xanax
Bromazepam	Lexotanil
Chlordiazepoxide	Librium
Clobazam	Frisium
Clonazepam	Klonopin, Rivotril
Clorazepate	Tranxene
Diazepam	Valium
Lorazepam	Ativan, Temesta
Oxazepam	Serax
Tofisopam	Emandaxin, Grandaxin

=== Non-Benzodiazepine Anxiolytics ===
INN	Common brand names
Buspirone	BuSpar, Spitomin
Hydroxyzine	Atarax, Vistaril
Meprobamate	Equanil, Miltown
Gabapentin	Neurontin, Gabaran
Pregabalin	Lyrica

=== Antidepressants ===
INN	Common brand names
Citalopram	Celexa, Cipramil
Clomipramine	Anafranil
Doxepin	Doxepin, Sinequan
Escitalopram	Cipralex, Lexapro
Fluoxetine	Prozac, Sarafem
Fluvoxamine	Fevarin, Luvox
Imipramine	Tofranil
Mirtazapine	Avanza, Remeron, Zispin
Paroxetine	Paxil, Pexeva, Seroxat
Sertraline	Lustral, Zoloft
Trazodone	Azona, Deprax, Desyrel, Oleptro, Trittico, Thombran

== Autism ==
=== Atypical antipsychotics ===
INN	Common brand names
Aripiprazole	Abilify
Risperidone	Risperdal

== Bipolar Disorder ==
=== Mood Stabilizers ===
INN	Common brand names
Carbamazepine	Carbatrol, Carnevix, Epitol, Equetro, Tegretol, Tegretol XR, Teril
Gabapentin	Neurontin
Lamotrigine	Lamictal
Levetiracetam	Keppra
Lithium salts	Camcolit, Eskalith, Lithobid, Sedalit
Oxcarbazepine	Trileptal
Topiramate	Topamax
Sodium valproate (Note: valproic acid sodium salt)	Convulex, Depakene, Depakine Enteric, Orfiril, Stavzor
Divalproex sodium (Note: also known as valproate semisodium or (sodium valproate and valproic acid in 1:1 ratio))	Depakote, Epival, Ergenyl Chrono
Sodium valproate and valproic acid in 2.3:1 ratio	Depakine Chrono, Depakine Chronosphere, Epilim Chrono, Epilim Chronosphere

=== Atypical Antipsychotics ===
INN	Common brand names
Aripiprazole	Abilify
Asenapine	Saphris, Sycrest
Cariprazine	Vraylar, Reagila
Lurasidone	Latuda
Olanzapine	Zyprexa
Quetiapine	Seroquel
Risperidone	Risperdal
Ziprasidone	Geodon, Zeldox

== Depressive Disorders ==
INN	Common brand names
Amisulpride	Amazeo, Amipride, Amival, Deniban, Solian, Soltus, Sulpitac, Sulprix
Amitriptyline	Elavil, Endep, Tryptanol, Tryptomer
Agomelatine	Valdoxan, Melitor, Thymanax
Bupropion	Aplenzin, Wellbutrin
Citalopram	Celexa, Cipramil
Clomipramine	Anafranil
Desipramine	Norpramin, Pertofrane
Desvenlafaxine	Pristiq
Doxepin	Aponal, Adapine, Deptran, Prudoxin, Silenor, Sinquan, Sinequan, Zonalon
Duloxetine	Cymbalta
Escitalopram	Cipralex, Lexapro
Fluoxetine	Prozac, Sarafem
Fluvoxamine	Luvox, Faverin
Imipramine	Antideprin, Tofranil
Lamotrigine	Lamictal
Levomilnacipran	Fetzima
Mirtazapine	Remeron, Avanza
Moclobemide	Aurorix, Manerix
Nortriptyline	Aventyl, Pamelor
Paroxetine	Paxil, Pexeva, Seroxat
Phenelzine	Nardil
Protriptyline	Vivactil
Reboxetine	Edronax, Norebox, Prolift, Solvex, Vestra
Rubidium chloride	Rubinorm
Selegiline	Emsam
Sertraline	Zoloft, Lustral
Tianeptine	Stablon, Coaxil, Tatinol
Tranylcypromine	Parnate
Trazodone	Azona, Deprax, Desyrel, Oleptro, Trittico, Thombran
Venlafaxine	Effexor, Effexor XR
Vilazodone	Viibryd
Vortioxetine	Trintellix

== Insomnia ==
=== Benzodiazepines ===
INN	Common brand names
Brotizolam	Lendormin
Estazolam	Eurodin, ProSom
Flunitrazepam	Hipnosedon, Hypnodorm, Rohypnol, Vulbegal
Flurazepam	Dalmadorm, Dalmane
Loprazolam	Dormonoct
Lormetazepam	Noctamid
Midazolam	Dormicum, Hypnofast
Nimetazepam	Erimin
Nitrazepam	Alodorm, Dumolid, Mogadon, Pacisyn, Radedorm 5
Phenazepam	Phenazepam, Phenorelaxan, Phezipam
Quazepam	Doral, Dormalin
Temazepam	Normison, Restoril
Triazolam	Halcion

=== Z-Drugs ===
INN	Common brand names
Eszopiclone	Lunesta
Zaleplon	Andante, Sonata, Starnoc
Zolpidem	Ambien CR, Hypnogen, Intermezzo, Ivadal, Sanval, Snovitel, Stilnoct, Stilnox, Sublinox
Zopiclone	Imovane, Imrest, Piclodorm, Somnol, Zimovane

=== Melatonergic Agents ===
INN	Common brand names
Agomelatine	Melitor, Thymanax, Valdoxan
Melatonin	Circadin, Melaxen
Ramelteon	Rozerem

=== Barbiturates ===
INN	Common brand names
Amobarbital	Amytal Sodium
Amobarbital/secobarbital	Tuinal
Butobarbital	Neonal, Soneryl
Cyclobarbital/Diazepam	Reladorm
Pentobarbital	Nembutal Sodium
Phenobarbital	Luminal
Secobarbital	Seconal Sodium

=== Sedating Antidepressants ===
INN	Common brand names
Amitriptyline	Elavil, Endep, Laroxyl, Lentizol, Saroten, Sarotex, Tryptizol, Tryptomer
Doxepin	Doxepin, Silenor
Mianserin	Bolvidon, Depnon, Lerivon, Tolvon
Mirtazapine	Avanza, Remeron, Zispin
Trazodone	Azona, Deprax, Desyrel, Oleptro, Trittico, Thombran
Trimipramine	Rhotrimine, Stangyl, Surmontil

=== Antihistamines ===
INN	Common brand names
Alimemazine	Nedeltran, Theralen, Theralene, Theraligene
Cyproheptadine	Periactin, Peritol
Diphenhydramine	Benadryl, Dimedrol, Daedalon, Nytol
Doxylamine	Donormyl, Dormidina, Dozile, NyQuil, Restavit, Somnil, Unisom SleepTab
Hydroxyzine	Atarax, Vistaril
Promethazine	Avomine, Fargan, Phenergan, Pipolphen, Promethegan, Prothiazine, Romergan, Sominex

=== Others ===
INN	Common brand names
Chloral hydrate	Chloraldurat, Somnote
Clomethiazole	Distraneurin, Heminevrin
Glutethimide	Doriden
Niaprazine	Nopron
Sodium oxybate	Alcover, Xyrem
Tizanidine	Sirdalud, Zanaflex

== Psychotic Disorders ==
=== Typical antipsychotics ===
==== Low potency ====
INN	Common brand names
Chlorprothixene	Truxal
Levomepromazine/methotrimeprazine	Levium, Levomepromazine Neuraxph, Neurocil
Perazine	Perazin Neuraxph, Taxilan
Promethazine	Atosil, Closin, Promethazin Neuraxph, Proneurin, Prothazin
Prothipendyl	Dominal
Sulpiride	Dogmatil, Dogmatyl, Sulpirid
Thioridazine	Mellaril, Thioridazin Neuraxph

==== Medium potency ====
INN	Common brand names
Perphenazine	Trilafon
Thiothixene	Navane

==== High potency ====
INN		Common brand names
Benperidol		Benperidol Neuraxph, Glianimon
Bromperidol		Impromen
Fluphenazine	decanoate	Anatensol, Dapotum D, Deconoat, Fludecate, Modecate, Prolixin Decanoate, Sinqualone
Fluphenazine	enanthate	Dapotum Injektion, Flunanthate, Moditen; Enanthate Injection, Sinqualone Enantat
Fluphenazine	hydrochloride	Dapotum, Permitil, Prolixin, Lyogen, Moditen, Omca, Sediten, Selecten, Sevinol, Siqualone, Trancin
Flupentixol		Depixol, Fluanxol
Fluspirilene		Fluspi, Fluspirilen Beta, Imap
Haloperidol		Haldol, Serenase
Pimozide		Orap
Trifluoperazine		Stelazine
Zuclopenthixol		Cisordinol, Clopixol

=== Atypical Antipsychotics ===
INN	Common brand names
Amisulpride	Solian
Aripiprazole	Abilify
Asenapine	Saphris
Clozapine	Clozaril, Fazaclo, Leponex
Iloperidone	Fanapt
Lurasidone	Latuda
Melperone	Eunerpan, Melneurin
Olanzapine	Zyprexa, Zyprexa Relprevv
Paliperidone	Invega, Invega Sustenna
Quetiapine	Seroquel
Risperidone	Risperdal, Risperdal Consta
Ziprasidone	Geodon, Zeldox
Zotepine	Nipolept

=== Adjuncts ===
INN	Common brand names
Carbamazepine	Tegretol
Lamotrigine	Lamictal

== See also ==
- List of psychiatric medications
- List of psychotropic medications
- List of psychiatric drugs by type
