= DSP-6745 =

Clinical data
- Other names: DSP6745
- Routes of administration: Oral
- Drug class: Serotonin reuptake inhibitor; Serotonin 5-HT_{2A} receptor antagonist; Serotonin 5-HT_{2C} receptor antagonist; Serotonin 5-HT_{7} receptor antagonist
- ATC code: None

Identifiers
- IUPAC name: 1-[5-[(2,5-difluorophenyl)methoxy]-1-(3,3-dimethylbutyl)pyrazol-3-yl]-N-methylmethanamine
- PubChem CID: 56601150
- ChemSpider: 128975464
- ChEMBL: ChEMBL5961024

Chemical and physical data
- Formula: C_{18}H_{25}F_{2}N_{3}O
- Molar mass: 337.415 g·mol^{−1}
- 3D model (JSmol): Interactive image
- SMILES: CC(C)(C)CCN1C(=CC(=N1)CNC)OCC2=C(C=CC(=C2)F)F
- InChI: InChI=1S/C18H25F2N3O/c1-18(2,3)7-8-23-17(10-15(22-23)11-21-4)24-12-13-9-14(19)5-6-16(13)20/h5-6,9-10,21H,7-8,11-12H2,1-4H3; Key:CESJQKNECLKVHF-UHFFFAOYSA-N

DSP-6745 is a serotonergic agent which was under development for the treatment of psychotic disorders but was never marketed. It is taken orally.

The drug acts as a serotonin reuptake inhibitor (SRI) and as an antagonist of the serotonin 5-HT_{2A}, 5-HT_{2C}, and 5-HT_{7} receptors. Its affinities (K_{i}) were 0.653 nM for the serotonin transporter (SERT), 0.331 nM for the serotonin 5-HT_{2A} receptor, 1.34 nM for the serotonin 5-HT_{2C} receptor, and 31.7 nM for the serotonin 5-HT_{7} receptor. Conversely, its IC_{50} or K_{b} values were 0.753 nM at the SERT, 0.566 nM at the serotonin 5-HT_{2A} receptor, 1.37 nM at the serotonin 5-HT_{2C} receptor, and 2.12 nM at the serotonin 5-HT_{7} receptor. It also shows lower affinity for a number of other receptors, such as the serotonin 5-HT_{2B} receptor (K_{i} = 7.58 nM). DSP-6745 produces antidepressant-like, anxiolytic-like, antipsychotic-like, and pro-cognitive effects in animals.

The chemical synthesis of DSP-6745 has been described.

DSP-6745 was first described in the scientific literature by 2024. It was under development by Sumitomo Dainippon Pharma or Sumitomo Pharma. The drug reached phase 1 clinical trials for psychotic disorders prior to the discontinuation of its development in November 2022.

== See also ==
- List of investigational antipsychotics
- Serotonin antagonist and reuptake inhibitor (SARI)
- Serotonin modulator and stimulator (SMS)
