= Spontaneous orgasm =

- Other names: Spontaneous ejaculation
- Specialty: Psychiatry, gynecology, urology

A spontaneous orgasm, or spontaneous ejaculation when it occurs in males, is an orgasm which occurs spontaneously and involuntarily without sexual stimulation. Nocturnal emissions may be considered a normal/physiological form of spontaneous orgasm. Pathological spontaneous orgasms can be experienced as pleasurable, non-pleasurable, or unpleasant, and can be distressing. Causes of pathological spontaneous orgasms include spinal cord lesions, psychological causes, rabies, and medications. Some cases may have no identifiable cause. Spontaneous orgasms may have no trigger or may be triggered by various non-sexual circumstances (e.g., urination, defecation, glans touch, anxiety, panic attacks, school examinations). They may occur in both males and females. Treatment of spontaneous orgasms include psychotherapy, selective serotonin reuptake inhibitors (SSRIs) (e.g., paroxetine, citalopram, sertraline), the alpha-1 blocker silodosin, and anxiolytics.

Medications have been associated with spontaneous orgasms as a side effect, with most cases being related to psychiatric medications like antidepressants, antipsychotics, and psychostimulants. This has included selective serotonin reuptake inhibitors (SSRIs) (e.g., citalopram, escitalopram, fluoxetine, sertraline), serotonin–norepinephrine reuptake inhibitors (SNRIs) (e.g., venlafaxine, milnacipran, duloxetine), norepinephrine reuptake inhibitors (NRIs) (e.g., atomoxetine, reboxetine), norepinephrine–dopamine reuptake inhibitors (NDRIs) (e.g., methylphenidate, bupropion), tricyclic antidepressants (TCAs) (e.g., imipramine, desipramine), monoamine oxidase inhibitors (MAOIs) (e.g., rasagiline), serotonin antagonists and reuptake inhibitors (SARIs) (e.g., nefazodone), psychostimulants (e.g., methylphenidate, dextroamphetamine), typical antipsychotics (e.g., zuclopenthixol, trifluoperazine, thiothixene), and atypical antipsychotics (e.g., olanzapine, aripiprazole, zotepine), among others. The antihistamine fexofenadine has also been reported as a cause of spontaneous orgasms.
