= Serotonin antagonist and reuptake inhibitor =

Class of drug

Chemical structure of the serotonin antagonist and reuptake inhibitor trazodone.

Serotonin antagonist and reuptake inhibitors (SARIs) are a class of drugs used mainly as antidepressants, but also as anxiolytics and hypnotics. They act by antagonizing serotonin receptors such as 5-HT_{2A} and inhibiting the reuptake of serotonin, norepinephrine, and/or dopamine. Additionally, most also antagonize α_{1}-adrenergic receptors. The majority of the currently marketed SARIs belong to the phenylpiperazine class of compounds.

== List of SARIs ==
=== Marketed ===
Commercially available serotonin antagonist and reuptake inhibitors include etoperidone (Axiomin, Etonin), lorpiprazole (Normarex), mepiprazole (Psigodal), nefazodone, utility complicated by life-threatening idiosyncratic hepatotoxicity (Serzone, Nefadar), and trazodone (Desyrel).

=== Never marketed ===
- lubazodone (YM-992, YM-35995) – a SARI that, as of this date, had not come to market.

=== Miscellaneous ===
- vilazodone (Viibryd) – a related drug not fitting into this class, as it acts solely as a 5-HT_{1A} receptor partial agonist, but not as a serotonin antagonist; generally labeled as serotonin modulator and stimulator.
- vortioxetine (Trintellix) – another closely related drug generally labeled as a serotonin modulator and stimulator.
- niaprazine (Nopron) – a related drug that does not inhibit the reuptake of serotonin or other monoamines.
- medifoxamine (Clédial, Gerdaxyl) – a serotonin–dopamine reuptake inhibitor and 5-HT_{2A} and 5-HT_{2C} receptor antagonist, although not grouped as such.

== Pharmacology ==
=== Binding profiles ===
The binding profiles of SARIs and some metabolites in terms of their affinities (K_{i}, nM) for various receptors and transporters are as follows:

Compound	SERT	NET	DAT	5-HT_{1A}	5-HT_{2A}	5-HT_{2B}	5-HT_{2C}	5-HT_{3}	5-HT_{6}	5-HT_{7}	α_{1}	α_{2}	D_{2}	H_{1}	mACh
Etoperidone	890	20,000	52,000	85	36	ND	ND	ND	ND	ND	38	570	2,300	3,100	>35,000
Hydroxynefazodone	165–1,203	376–1,053	ND	56–589	7.2–34	ND	ND	ND	ND	ND	8.0–145	63–2,490	ND	ND	11,357
mCPP	202–432	1,940–4,360	ND	44–400	32–398	3.2–63	3.4–251	427	1,748	163	97–2,900	106–570	>10,000	326	>10,000
Nefazodone	200–459	360–618	360	80	26	ND	72	ND	ND	ND	5.5–48	84–640	910	≥370	>10,000
Trazodone	160–367	≥8,500	≥7,400	96–118	20–45	74–189	224–402	>10,000	>10,000	1,782	12–153	106–728	≥3,500	220–1,100	>10,000
Triazoledione	≥34,527	>100,000	ND	636–1,371	159–211	ND	ND	ND	ND	ND	173	1,915	ND	ND	>100,000
Values are K_{i} (nM). The smaller the value, the more strongly the drug binds to the site. For assay species and references, see the individual drug articles. Most but not all values are for human proteins.

These drugs act as antagonists or inverse agonists of the 5-HT_{2A}, α_{1}-adrenergic, and H_{1} receptors, as partial agonists of the 5-HT_{1A} receptor, and as inhibitors of the transporters. mCPP is an antagonist of the 5-HT_{2B} receptor, an agonist of the 5-HT_{1A}, 5-HT_{2C}, and 5-HT_{3} receptors, and acts as a partial agonist of the human 5-HT_{2A} and 5-HT_{2C} receptors.

== See also ==
- List of antidepressants
- Serotonin modulator and stimulator (SMS)
- Noradrenergic and specific serotonergic antidepressant (NaSSA)
- Norepinephrine-dopamine disinhibitor (NDDI)
- Selective serotonin reuptake inhibitor (SSRI)
- DSP-6745
