= Etoperidone =

Chemical compound

Clinical data
- Trade names: Several
- Other names: ST-1191; McN-A-2673-11
- Routes of administration: By mouth
- ATC code: N06AB09 (WHO)

Identifiers
- IUPAC name: 2-[3-[4-(3-chlorophenyl)piperazin-1-yl]propyl]-4,5-diethyl-1,2,4-triazol-3-one
- CAS Number: 52942-31-1
- PubChem CID: 40589
- ChemSpider: 37083
- UNII: KAI6MVO39Z
- ChEMBL: ChEMBL1743259
- CompTox Dashboard (EPA): DTXSID0023034

Chemical and physical data
- Formula: C_{19}H_{28}ClN_{5}O
- Molar mass: 377.92 g·mol^{−1}
- 3D model (JSmol): Interactive image
- SMILES: Clc3cccc(N2CCN(CCCN1/N=C(\N(C1=O)CC)CC)CC2)c3
- InChI: InChI=1S/C19H28ClN5O/c1-3-18-21-25(19(26)24(18)4-2)10-6-9-22-11-13-23(14-12-22)17-8-5-7-16(20)15-17/h5,7-8,15H,3-4,6,9-14H2,1-2H3; Key:IZBNNCFOBMGTQX-UHFFFAOYSA-N

Etoperidone, associated with several brand names, is an atypical antidepressant which was developed in the 1970s and either is no longer marketed or was never marketed. It is a phenylpiperazine related to trazodone and nefazodone in chemical structure and is a serotonin antagonist and reuptake inhibitor (SARI) similarly to them.

== Medical uses ==
Etoperidone was used or was intended for use as an antidepressant in the treatment of depression.

Etoperidone might be useful as a hallucinogen antidote or "trip killer" in blocking the effects of serotonergic psychedelics like psilocybin and lysergic acid diethylamide (LSD).

== Pharmacology ==
=== Pharmacodynamics ===
Etoperidone
Site	K_{i} (nM)	Species	Ref
SERT	890	Human	
NET	20,000	Human	
DAT	52,000	Human	
5-HT_{1A}	85	Human	
5-HT_{2A}	36	Human	
5-HT_{2C}	?	?	?
α_{1}	38	Human	
α_{2}	570	Human	
D_{2}	2,300	Human	
H_{1}	3,100	Human	
mACh	>35,000	Human	
Values are K_{i} (nM). The smaller the value, the more strongly the drug binds to the site.

Etoperidone is as an antagonist of several receptors in the following order of potency: 5-HT_{2A} receptor (36 nM) > α_{1}-adrenergic receptor (38 nM) > 5-HT_{1A} receptor (85 nM) (may be a partial agonist) > α_{2}-adrenergic receptor (570 nM); it has only very weak or negligible affinity for blocking the following receptors: D_{2} receptor (2,300 nM) > H_{1} receptor (3,100 nM) > mACh receptors (>35,000 nM). In addition to its receptor blockade, etoperidone also has weak affinity for the monoamine transporters as well: serotonin transporter (890 nM) > norepinephrine transporter (20,000 nM) > dopamine transporter (52,000 nM).

=== Pharmacokinetics ===
Etoperidone is metabolized in part to meta-chlorophenylpiperazine (mCPP), which likely accounts for its serotonergic effects.

== Chemistry ==
Etoperidone is a phenylpiperazine and is chemically related to nefazodone and trazodone.

== History ==
Etoperidone was discovered by scientists at Angelini, who also discovered trazodone. Its development names have included ST-1191 and McN-A-2673-11. The INN etoperidone was proposed in 1976 and recommended in 1977. The drug was given brand names in Spain (Centren (Esteve) and Depraser (Lepori)) and Italy (Staff (Sigma Tau)) and was also given the brand names Axiomin and Etonin, but it is not entirely clear if it was actually marketed; the Pharmaceutical Manufacturing Encyclopedia provides no dates for commercial introduction. According to Micromedex's Index Nominum: International Drug Directory, etoperidone was indeed previously marketed in Spain and Italy.

== Society and culture ==
=== Generic names ===
Etoperidone is the generic name of the drug and its INN, while etoperidone hydrochloride is its USAN.

=== Brand names ===
Etoperidone has been associated with the brand names Axiomin, Centren, Depraser, Etonin, and Staff.

== Research ==
Etoperidone has been studied in dementia and found to be about as effective as thioridazine.

== See also ==
- List of antidepressants
