= Centrax =

British gas turbine company

Centrax Ltd
- Industry: Industrial gas turbines and engine components
- Founded: 1946
- Headquarters: Shaldon Road, Newton Abbot, Devon, TQ12 4SQ
- Area served: Worldwide
- Products: Gas turbine generating sets, and turbine blades and discs
- Revenue: 66,000,000 (In 2022)
- Operating income: 3,800,000 (In 2022)
- Number of employees: 700
- Parent: Centrax Industries
- Divisions: 2
- Subsidiaries: Centrax Engineering Ltd
- Website: www.centraxind.com

Centrax, also known as Centrax Limited, is an engineering company based in Newton Abbot, Devon in the power generation industry making generating sets with Siemens gas turbine engines. These are known as industrial gas turbines.

== History ==
Centrax was founded in 1946 by Richard HH Barr OBE, the chairman, Geoffrey R White, the technical director, who had worked with Sir Frank Whittle in the early stages of jet engines at Power Jets and Joseph Salim Peress.

In 1955 Centrax opened its compressor and turbine blade factory in Devon and became Centrax Ltd. In 1964 it entered into a joint arrangement with Misco Precision Casting (the Michigan-based Misco division of Howmet Castings of Ohio) of the US and formed Central-Misco Ltd, a division of the company that made metal products with investment casting. It operated separate to the main company. Centrax has two main operating Divisions: Centrax Limited and Centrax Turbine Components Limited. The Gas Turbine Division designed, built and packages its own small gas turbine for industrial uses and since 1979, Centrax has been packaging the Rolls-Royce 501 aeroderivative gas turbine engine. In 2007 signed an exclusive deal with Rolls-Royce to package the 64 MW Rolls-Royce Trent 60 engine in a generating set in Europe-wide industrial projects. It opened a new factory on its site to build the Trent 60 sets. In 2011 Centrax Limited signed an agreement with Siemens to package the Siemens 300 and 400 industrial gas turbine for markets in UK, France, Italy, The Netherlands and Belgium.

== Awards ==
In 1969 it won a Queen's Award to Industry for export achievement and in 2002 and 2010 Queen's Award for Enterprise.

== Structure ==
Centrax has two divisions:

=== Gas Turbine Division ===
Centrax Limited packages the Rolls-Royce 501 range of industrial gas turbines (Now part of the Siemens portfolio and brought to market as the Siemens SGT-A05 AE since 2017) which range from 3.9 to 5.2 Megawatts as well as the Rolls-Royce Trent 60 gas turbine (64 Megawatts). Since 2011 Centrax has been packaging the Siemens 300 and 400 industrial gas turbines for 5 countries in Europe. This has since been expanded to all EU countries + Turkey. The main market for the division is the combined heat and power market in Europe including Eastern Europe and previously Russia.

=== Turbine Components ===
Centrax manufactures precision components for jet engines, namely compressor and turbine aerofoils (blades), discs, shafts and casings.

=== Worldwide ===
Centrax Ltd. has service depots in:

- Zoeterwoude, Netherlands
- Gießen (Wieseck), Germany
- Warsaw, Poland
- Montale Rangone, Italy
- Ormes, Loiret, France
- Oeiras Municipality, Portugal
- Castellón, Spain

== Market ==
Centrax sells turbine blade components to civil and military aircraft companies and operators around the world. Centrax industrial gas turbine generating sets are sold for power generation and combined heat and power systems - usually large manufacturing plants that require large amounts of heating or steam. It exports 95% of its turnover.

== Products ==
Throughout its history, Centrax's generating sets ranged from 3.9MW to 64MW and are based on the Rolls-Royce 501 (c.5MW) and Trent 60 engines. Centrax turbine components include much of a complete jet engine except to combustion equipment.

Since the signing of an exclusive packager agreement with Siemens in 2011 Centrax offers the following options of generating sets:

- CX501 KB5 - 3.9MW
- CX501 KB7 - 5.3MW
- CX300 - 7.9MW
- CX300 - 8.5MW
- CX400 - 10.4MW
- CX400 - 12.9MW
- CX400 - 14.4MW

In the past they did offer the generating sets listed below, however they are no longer a part of the product range:

- CX211 - 33MW
- Trent 60WLE - 60.5MW
- Trent 60WLE ISI - 64MW

== See also ==
- Components of jet engines
