= Trazodone =

Antidepressant medication

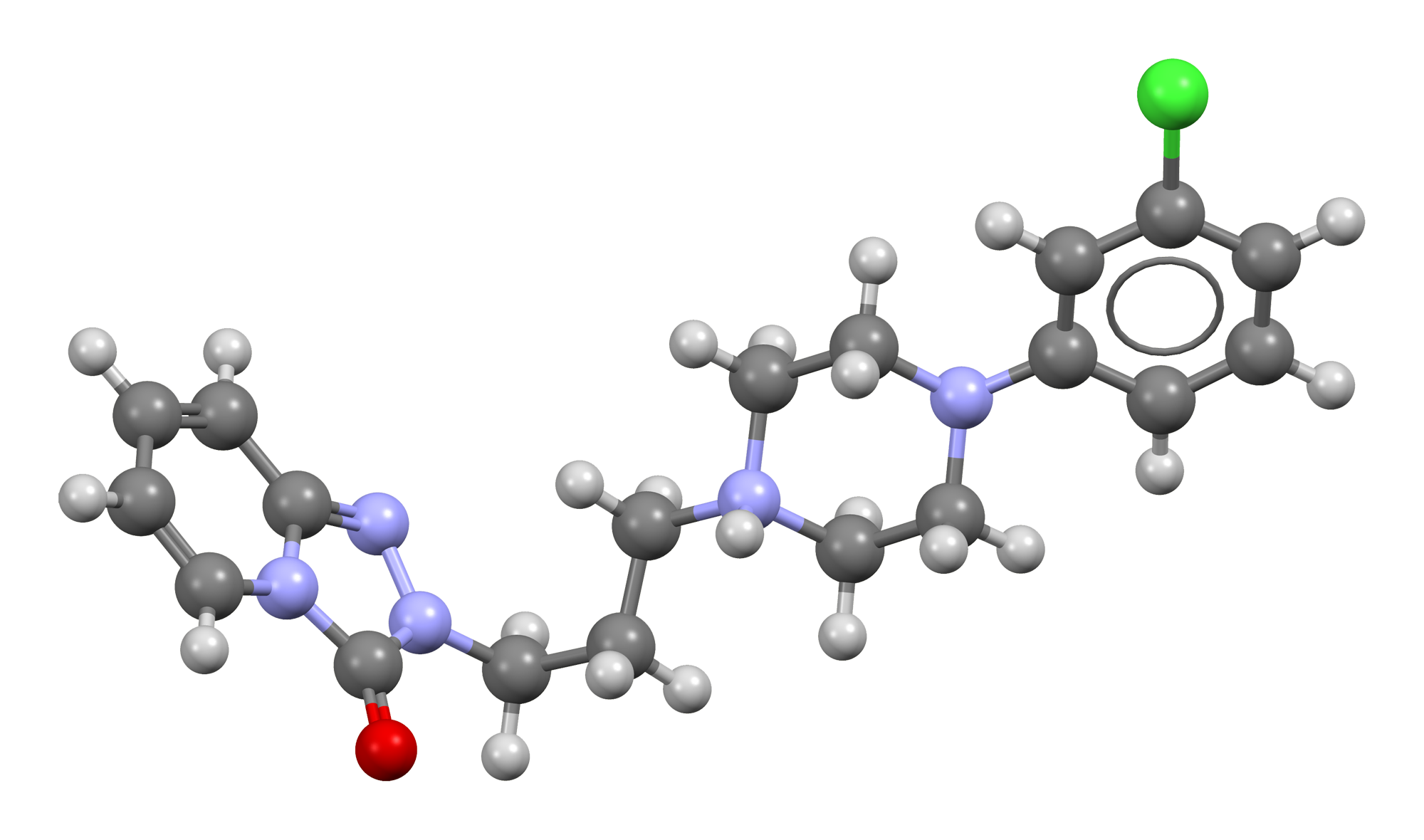

Clinical data
- Trade names: Desyrel, others
- Other names: AF-1161
- AHFS/Drugs.com: Monograph
- MedlinePlus: a681038
- License data: US DailyMed: Trazodone
- Dependence liability: Low
- Addiction liability: None
- Routes of administration: By mouth
- Drug class: Serotonin antagonist and reuptake inhibitor (SARI); Serotonin 5-HT_{2A} receptor antagonist; α_{1}-Adrenergic receptor antagonist; Serotonin reuptake inhibitor
- ATC code: N06AX05 (WHO)

Legal status
- Legal status: AU: S4 (Prescription only); BR: Class C1 (Other controlled substances); CA: ℞-only; UK: POM (Prescription only); US: ℞-only; In general: ℞ (Prescription only)

Pharmacokinetic data
- Bioavailability: By mouth: 63–80%
- Protein binding: 89–95%
- Metabolism: Liver (CYP3A4, CYP2D6, CYP1A2?)
- Metabolites: mCPP
- Onset of action: By mouth (IR): 1 hour (T_{max})
- Elimination half-life: • Trazodone (IR): 4–15 hours • Trazodone (ER): 9–13 hours • mCPP: 3–16 hours
- Excretion: Urine: 70–75% Feces: 21%

Identifiers
- IUPAC name: 2-{3-[4-(3-Chlorophenyl)piperazin-1-yl]propyl}[1,2,4]triazolo[4,3-a]pyridin-3(2H)-one
- CAS Number: 19794-93-5
- PubChem CID: 5533
- IUPHAR/BPS: 213
- DrugBank: DB00656
- ChemSpider: 5332
- UNII: YBK48BXK30
- KEGG: D08626; as HCl: D00820
- ChEBI: CHEBI:9654
- ChEMBL: ChEMBL621
- CompTox Dashboard (EPA): DTXSID5045043
- ECHA InfoCard: 100.039.364

Chemical and physical data
- Formula: C_{19}H_{22}ClN_{5}O
- Molar mass: 371.87 g·mol^{−1}
- 3D model (JSmol): Interactive image
- Melting point: 87 °C (189 °F)
- SMILES: Clc4cccc(N3CCN(CCCN1/N=C2/C=C\C=C/N2C1=O)CC3)c4
- InChI: InChI=1S/C19H22ClN5O/c20-16-5-3-6-17(15-16)23-13-11-22(12-14-23)8-4-10-25-19(26)24-9-2-1-7-18(24)21-25/h1-3,5-7,9,15H,4,8,10-14H2; Key:PHLBKPHSAVXXEF-UHFFFAOYSA-N

Trazodone is an antidepressant medication used to treat major depressive disorder, anxiety disorders, and insomnia. It is a phenylpiperazine compound of the serotonin antagonist and reuptake inhibitor (SARI) class. The medication is taken orally.

Common side effects include dry mouth, feeling faint, vomiting, and headache. More serious side effects may include suicidal ideation, mania, irregular heart rate, and pathologically prolonged erections. It is unclear if use during pregnancy or breastfeeding is safe. Trazodone also has sedating effects.

Trazodone was approved for medical use in the United States in 1981. It is available as a generic medication. In 2024, it was the twentieth most commonly prescribed medication in the United States, with more than 26 million prescriptions.

== Medical uses ==
=== Depression ===
The primary use of trazodone is the treatment of unipolar major depression with or without anxiety. Data from open and double-blind trials suggest that the antidepressant efficacy of trazodone is comparable to that of amitriptyline, doxepin, and mianserin. Furthermore, trazodone has shown anxiolytic properties, low cardiotoxicity, and relatively mild side effects.

Because trazodone has minimal anticholinergic activity, it was especially welcomed as a treatment for geriatric patients with depression when it first became available. Three double-blind studies reported trazodone had antidepressant efficacy similar to that of other antidepressants in geriatric patients. Unfortunately, a side effect of trazodone, orthostatic hypotension, may cause dizziness and increase the risk of falling. This may have devastating consequences for elderly patients. Therefore, this side effect, along with sedation, often makes trazodone less acceptable for this population compared to newer compounds that share its lack of anticholinergic activity (but not the rest of its side effect profile). Still, trazodone is often helpful for geriatric patients with depression who have severe agitation and insomnia.

Trazodone is usually used at a dosage of 150 to 300 mg/day for the treatment of depression. Lower doses have also been used to augment other antidepressants or when initiating therapy. Higher doses, up to 600 mg/day, have been used in more severe cases of depression (in hospitalized patients, for example). Trazodone is usually administered multiple times per day, but once-daily administration may be similarly effective.

=== Insomnia ===
Low-dose trazodone is used off-label in the treatment of insomnia and is considered to be effective and safe for this indication. It may also be used to treat antidepressant-related insomnia. Trazodone was the second-most prescribed agent for insomnia in the early 2000s even though most studies of trazodone for the treatment of sleep disturbances have been in depressed individuals.

Systematic reviews and meta-analyses published in the late 2010s, including a Cochrane review, found low-dose trazodone to be an effective medication for short-term treatment of insomnia in both depressed and euthymic people. Trazodone slightly improves subjective sleep quality (SMD = –0.34 to –0.41) and reduces the number of nighttime awakenings (MD = –0.31, SMD = –0.51), on average. Conversely, it does not appear to affect sleep onset, total sleep time, time awake after sleep onset, or sleep efficiency. It appears to increase deep sleep—in contrast to certain other hypnotics. The quality of evidence of trazodone for short-term treatment of insomnia was rated as low to moderate. There is no evidence available at present to inform the long-term use of trazodone in the treatment of insomnia.

The benefits of trazodone for insomnia must be weighed against potential adverse effects, such as morning grogginess, daytime sleepiness, cognitive and motor impairment, and postural hypotension, among others. Quality safety data on the use of trazodone as a sleep aid are currently lacking.

Trazodone is used at low doses in the range of 50 to 150 mg/day for insomnia. Higher doses of 200 to 600 mg/day have also been studied.

The American Academy of Sleep Medicine's 2017 clinical practice guidelines recommended against the use of trazodone in the treatment of insomnia due to inadequate evidence and due to harms potentially outweighing benefits.

=== Other disorders ===
Trazodone is often used in the treatment of anxiety disorders—such as generalized anxiety disorder and panic disorder—as well as in post-traumatic stress disorder (PTSD) and obsessive–compulsive disorder (OCD). Trazodone is often used as an alternative to benzodiazepines in the treatment of anxiety disorders. However, use of trazodone in anxiety disorders is off-label and evidence of its effectiveness for these indications is variable and limited. Benefits for OCD appear to be mild. Trazodone has been used to treat sleep disturbances and nightmares in PTSD.

=== Combination with other antidepressants ===
Trazodone is often used in combination with other antidepressants such as selective serotonin reuptake inhibitors in order to augment their antidepressant and anxiolytic effects and to reduce side effects such as sexual dysfunction, anxiety, and insomnia.

=== Available forms ===
Trazodone is provided as the hydrochloride salt and is available in the form of 50 mg, 100 mg, 150 mg, and 300 mg oral tablets. In Italy, it is also available as an oral solution (Trittico 60 mg/mL) with a dosing pipette marked at 25 mg and 50 mg.

An extended-release oral tablet formulation at doses of 150 mg and 300 mg is also available.

== Side effects ==
Because of its lack of anticholinergic side effects, trazodone is especially useful in situations in which antimuscarinic effects are particularly problematic (e.g., in patients with benign prostatic hyperplasia, closed-angle glaucoma, or severe constipation). Trazodone's propensity to cause sedation is a dual-edged sword. For many patients, the relief from agitation, anxiety, and insomnia can be rapid; for other patients, including those individuals with considerable psychomotor retardation and feelings of low energy, therapeutic doses of trazodone may not be tolerable because of sedation. Trazodone elicits orthostatic hypotension in some people, probably as a consequence of α_{1}-adrenergic receptor blockade. The unmasking of bipolar disorder may occur with trazodone and other antidepressants.

Precautions for trazodone include known hypersensitivity to trazodone and under 18 years and combined with other antidepressant medications, it may increase the possibility of suicidal thoughts or actions.

While trazodone is not a true member of the SSRI class of antidepressants, it does still share many properties of SSRIs, especially the possibility of discontinuation syndrome if the medication is stopped too quickly. Thus, care must be taken when coming off the medication, usually by a gradual process of tapering down the dose over time.

=== Suicide ===
Antidepressants may increase the risk of suicidal thoughts and behaviors in children and young adults. Close monitoring for the emergence of suicidal thoughts and behaviors is thus recommended.

=== Sedation ===
Since trazodone may impair the mental or physical abilities required for the performance of potentially hazardous tasks, such as operating an automobile or machinery, the patient should be cautioned not to engage in such activities while impaired. Compared to the reversible MAOI antidepressant drug moclobemide, more impairment of vigilance occurs with trazodone. Trazodone has been found to impair driving ability.

=== Cardiac ===
Case reports have noted cardiac arrhythmias emerging in relation to trazodone treatment, both in patients with pre-existing mitral valve prolapse and in patients with negative personal and family histories of cardiac disease.

QT prolongation has been reported with trazodone therapy. Arrhythmia identified include isolated PVCs, ventricular couplets, and in two patients short episodes (three to four beats) of ventricular tachycardia. Several post-marketing reports have been made of arrhythmia in trazodone-treated patients who have pre-existing cardiac disease and in some patients who did not have pre-existing cardiac disease. Until the results of prospective studies are available, patients with pre-existing cardiac disease should be closely monitored, particularly for cardiac arrhythmias. Trazodone is not recommended for use during the initial recovery phase of myocardial infarction (heart attack). Concomitant administration of drugs that prolong the QT interval or that are inhibitors of CYP3A4 may increase the risk of cardiac arrhythmia.

=== Priapism ===
A relatively rare side effect associated with trazodone is priapism, likely due to its antagonism at α-adrenergic receptors. More than 200 cases have been reported, and the manufacturer estimated that the incidence of any abnormal erectile function is about one in 6,000 male patients treated with trazodone. The risk for this side effect appears to be greatest during the first month of treatment at low dosages (i.e. <150 mg/day). Early recognition of any abnormal erectile function is important, including prolonged or inappropriate erections, and should prompt discontinuation of trazodone treatment. Spontaneous orgasms have also been reported with trazodone in men.

Clinical reports have described trazodone-associated psychosexual side effects in women as well, including increased libido, priapism of the clitoris, and spontaneous orgasms.

=== Others ===
Rare cases of liver toxicity have been observed, possibly due to the formation of reactive metabolites.

Elevated prolactin concentrations have been observed in people taking trazodone. They appear to be increased by around 1.5- to 2-fold.

Studies on trazodone and cognitive function are mixed, with some finding improvement and others finding no change.

Trazodone does not seem to worsen periodic limb movements during sleep.

Trazodone is associated with an increased risk of falls in older adults. It has also been associated with increased risk of hip fractures in older adults.

=== Pregnancy and lactation ===
Sufficient data in humans are lacking. Use should be justified by the severity of the condition to be treated.

== Overdose ==
There are reported cases of high doses of trazodone precipitating serotonin syndrome. There are also reports of patients taking multiple SSRIs with trazodone and precipitating serotonin syndrome.

Trazodone appears to be relatively safer than TCAs, MAOIs, and a few of the other second-generation antidepressants in overdose situations, especially when it is the only agent taken. The typical dose is around 150 mg, though some individuals may require higher amounts. However, taking more than 600 mg within 24 hours substantially increases the risk of overdose.

Fatalities are rare, and uneventful recoveries have been reported after ingestion of doses as high as 6,000–9,200 mg. In one report, 9 of 294 cases of overdose were fatal, and all nine patients had also taken other central nervous system (CNS) depressants. When trazodone overdoses occur, clinicians should carefully monitor for low blood pressure, a potentially serious toxic effect. In a report of a fatal trazodone overdose, torsades de pointes and complete atrioventricular block developed, along with subsequent multiple organ failure, with a trazodone plasma concentration of 25.4 mg/L on admission.

== Interactions ==
=== Cytochrome P450 inhibitors and inducers ===
Trazodone is metabolized by several liver enzymes, including CYP3A4, CYP2D6, and CYP1A2. Its active metabolite meta-chlorophenylpiperazine (mCPP) is known to be formed by CYP3A4 and metabolized by CYP2D6. Inhibition or induction of the aforementioned enzymes by various other substances may alter the metabolism of trazodone or mCPP, leading to increased or decreased blood concentrations. The enzymes in question are known to be inhibited and induced by many medications, herbs, and foods, and as such, trazodone may interact with these substances.

Potent CYP3A4 inhibitors such as clarithromycin, erythromycin, fluvoxamine, grapefruit juice, ketoconazole, and ritonavir may lead to increased concentrations of trazodone and decreased concentrations of mCPP, while CYP3A4 inducers like carbamazepine, enzalutamide, phenytoin, phenobarbital, and St. John's wort may result in decreased trazodone concentrations and increased mCPP concentrations. CYP2D6 inhibitors may result in increased concentrations of both trazodone and mCPP, while CYP2D6 inducers may decrease their concentrations. Examples of potent CYP2D6 inhibitors include bupropion, cannabidiol, duloxetine, fluoxetine, paroxetine, quinidine, and ritonavir, while CYP2D6 inducers include dexamethasone, glutethimide, and haloperidol.

CYP1A2 inhibitors may increase trazodone concentrations, while CYP1A2 inducers may decrease trazodone concentrations. Examples of potent CYP1A2 inhibitors include ethinylestradiol (found in hormonal birth control), fluoroquinolones (e.g., ciprofloxacin), fluvoxamine, and St. John's wort, while potent CYP1A2 inducers include phenytoin, rifampin, ritonavir, and tobacco.

A study found that ritonavir, a strong CYP3A4 and CYP2D6 inhibitor and moderate CYP1A2 inducer, increased trazodone peak levels by 1.4-fold, trazodone area-under-the-curve levels by 2.4-fold, and decreased trazodone clearance by 50%. This was associated with adverse effects such as nausea, hypotension, and syncope. Another study found that the strong CYP3A4 inducer carbamazepine reduced concentrations of trazodone by 60 to 74%. The strong CYP2D6 inhibitor thioridazine has been reported to increase trazodone levels by 1.4-fold and concentrations of mCPP by 1.5-fold. Fluoxetine, a strong inhibitor of CYP2D6 and a weak or moderate inhibitor of CYP3A4, has been reported to increase levels of trazodone by 1.3- to 1.7-fold and of mCPP by 3.0- to 3.4-fold.

Conversely, CYP2D6 genotype has not been found to predict trazodone or mCPP concentrations with trazodone therapy, although CYP2D6 genotype did correlate with side effects like dizziness and prolonged corrected QT interval. Smokers have lower levels of trazodone and higher ratios of mCPP to trazodone. Trazodone levels were 30% lower in smokers and mCPP to trazodone ratio was 1.3-fold higher in smokers, whereas mCPP concentrations were not different between smokers and non-smokers. Smoking is known to induce CYP1A2, and this may be involved in these findings.

=== Serotonergic agents and serotonin syndrome ===
Combination of trazodone with selective serotonin reuptake inhibitors (SSRIs), tricyclic antidepressants (TCAs), or monoamine oxidase inhibitors (MAOIs) has a theoretical risk of serotonin syndrome. However, trazodone has been studied in combination with SSRIs and seemed to be safe in this context. On the other hand, cases of excessive sedation and serotonin syndrome have been reported with a combination of trazodone and fluoxetine or paroxetine. This may be due to the combined potentiation of the serotonin system. Or it may be related to the inhibition of cytochrome P450 enzymes by fluoxetine and paroxetine and consequently increased trazodone and mCPP levels.

=== Antagonism of serotonergic psychedelics ===
Serotonergic psychedelics like lysergic acid diethylamide (LSD) and psilocybin are thought to mediate their hallucinogenic effects by activating serotonin 5-HT_{2A} receptors. By displacing them from the 5-HT_{2A} receptor, serotonin 5-HT_{2A} receptor antagonists can block the hallucinogenic effects of serotonergic psychedelics. Serotonin 5-HT_{2A} receptor antagonists like ketanserin and risperidone have been found to fully block or dose-dependently reduce the subjective effects of LSD and psilocybin in clinical studies.

Trazodone is a potent serotonin 5-HT_{2A} receptor antagonist and may have similar effects. Studies have estimated that trazodone occupies 90 to 97% of 5-HT_{2A} receptors at doses of 50 to 200 mg/day. Trazodone is less-studied in blocking the effects of serotonergic psychedelics than other serotonin 5-HT_{2A} receptor antagonists like ketanserin and risperidone, but has been reported to reduce the effects of psychedelics in published case reports. Specifically, a woman on trazodone 200 mg/day who received a "moderate" dose of LSD was reported to have had reduced LSD-related hallucinogenic and physiological effects. In addition, in another instance, a man on trazodone 200 mg/day who received 25 mg psilocybin (a moderate dose) experienced no psychedelic effects at all.

Trazodone has been used and discussed extensively online as a trip killer by recreational psychedelic users. It was recommended on the social media website Reddit for such purposes 77 times by 2024 with a suggested dose range of 50 to 150 mg. Trazodone was one of the most commonly recommended drugs for such purposes, exceeded only by alprazolam, benzodiazepines generally, and quetiapine.

== Pharmacology ==
=== Pharmacodynamics ===
Trazodone (and metabolite)
Site	Trazodone	mCPP	Species	Ref
SERT	160–>10,000	202–432	Human	
NET	≥8,500	≥1,940	Human	
DAT	≥7,400	ND	Human	
5-HT_{1A}	96–118	44–400	Human	
5-HT_{1B}	>10,000	89–501	Human	
5-HT_{1D}	106	210–1,300	Human	
5-HT_{1E}	>10,000	ND	Human	
5-HT_{1F}	ND	ND	ND	ND
5-HT_{2A}	20–45	32–398	Human	
5-HT_{2B}	74–189	3.2–63	Human	
5-HT_{2C}	224–402	3.4–251	Human	
5-HT_{3}	>10,000	427	Human	
5-HT_{4}	ND	ND	ND	ND
5-HT_{5A}	>10,000	1,354	Human	
5-HT_{6}	>10,000	1,748	Human	
5-HT_{7}	1,782	163	Human	
α_{1}	12–42	97–2,900	Human	
α_{1A}	153	1,386	Human	
α_{1B}	ND	915	Human	
α_{1D}	ND	ND	ND	ND
α_{2}	106–490	112–570	Human	
α_{2A}	728	145	Human	
α_{2B}	ND	106	Human	
α_{2C}	155	124	Human	
β	>10,000	2,500	Human	
β_{1}	>10,000	2,359	Human	
β_{2}	>10,000	3,474	Human	
D_{1}	3,730	7,000	Human	
D_{2}	≥3,500	>10,000	Human	
D_{3}	353	>10,000	Rat	
D_{4}	703	ND	Human	
D_{5}	>10,000	>10,000	Human	
H_{1}	220–1,100	326	Human	
H_{2}	3,290	ND	Human	
H_{3}	>10,000	ND	Guinea pig	
H_{4}	>10,000	ND	Human	
mAChRs	>10,000	>10,000	Human	
nAChRs	>10,000	>10,000	Human	
σ_{1}	>10,000	ND	Rat	
σ_{2}	536	8,350	Rat	
I_{1}	ND	759	Rat	
NMDAR (MK-801)	>10,000	ND	Rat	
VDCCs	>10,000	6,043	Rat	
Values are K_{i} (nM). The smaller the value, the more strongly the drug binds to the site.

Trazodone is a mixed agonist and antagonist of various serotonin receptors, antagonist of adrenergic receptors, weak histamine H_{1} receptor antagonist, and weak serotonin reuptake inhibitor. More specifically, it is an antagonist of 5-HT_{2A} and 5-HT_{2B} receptors, a partial agonist of the 5-HT_{1A} receptor, and an antagonist of the α_{1}- and α_{2}-adrenergic receptors. It is also a ligand of the 5-HT_{2C} receptor with lower affinity than for the 5-HT_{2A} receptor. However, it is unknown whether trazodone acts as a full agonist, partial agonist, or antagonist of the 5-HT_{2C} receptor. Trazodone is a 5-HT_{1A} receptor partial agonist similarly to buspirone and tandospirone but with comparatively greater intrinsic activity. A range of weak affinities (K_{i}) have been reported for trazodone at the human histamine H_{1} receptor, including 220 nM, 350 nM, 500 nM, and 1,100 nM.

Trazodone has a minor active metabolite known as meta-chlorophenylpiperazine (mCPP), and this metabolite may contribute to some degree to the pharmacological properties of trazodone. In contrast to trazodone, mCPP is an agonist of various serotonin receptors. It has relatively low affinity for α_{1}-adrenergic receptors unlike trazodone, but does have high affinity for α_{2}-adrenergic receptors and weak affinity for the H_{1} receptor. In addition to direct interactions with serotonin receptors, mCPP is a serotonin releasing agent similarly to agents like fenfluramine and MDMA. In contrast to these serotonin releasing agents however, mCPP does not appear to cause long-term serotonin depletion (a property thought to be related to serotonergic neurotoxicity).

Trazodone's 5-HT_{2A} receptor antagonism and weak serotonin reuptake inhibition form the basis of its common label as an antidepressant of the serotonin antagonist and reuptake inhibitor (SARI) type.

==== Target occupancy studies ====
Studies have estimated occupancy of target sites by trazodone based on trazodone concentrations in blood and brain and on the affinities of trazodone for the human targets in question. Roughly half of brain 5-HT_{2A} receptors are blocked by 1 mg of trazodone and essentially all 5-HT_{2A} receptors are saturated at 10 mg of trazodone, but the clinically effective hypnotic doses of trazodone are in the 25–100 mg range. The occupancy of the serotonin transporter (SERT) by trazodone is estimated to be 86% at 100 mg/day and 90% at 150 mg/day. Trazodone may almost completely occupy the 5-HT_{2A} and 5-HT_{2C} receptors at doses of 100 to 150 mg/day. Significant occupancy of a number of other sites may also occur. However, another study estimated much lower occupancy of the SERT and 5-HT_{2A} receptors by trazodone.

Estimated occupancy of biological targets by trazodone at different doses
Target	Estimated target occupancy		
Target	50 mg/day	100 mg/day	150 mg/day
SERT	75%	86%	90%
5-HT_{1A}	91%	95%	97%
5-HT_{1D}	91%	95%	97%
5-HT_{2A}	97%	98%	99%
5-HT_{2B}	94%	97%	98%
5-HT_{2C}	83%	91%	94%
5-HT_{7}	39%	56%	66%
α_{1A}	88%	94%	96%
α_{2A}	61%	75%	82%
α_{2C}	88%	94%	96%
D_{4}	62%	76%	83%
H_{1}	84%	91%	94%
Very low (<25–33%): NET, DAT, 5-HT_{1B}, 5-HT_{1E}, 5-HT_{3}, 5-HT_{5A}, 5-HT_{6}, β_{1}, β_{2}, D_{5}, H_{4}, mAChRs, nAChRs. Low (<50%): D_{1}, D_{2}. Not determined: α_{1B}, α_{2B}, D_{3}. Note: Another study estimated much lower occupancies.

==== Effects in preclinical studies ====
Trazodone shows antidepressant- and anxiolytic-like effects in animals. However, it shows differences from certain other antidepressants, like the tricyclic antidepressants, in animals. For example, it does not reverse the behavioral effects of the monoamine depleting agent reserpine and does not potentiate the effects of amphetamine or levodopa. Similarly to antipsychotics, trazodone reduces spontaneous motor activity, spontaneous and elicited aggressive behavior, and exploratory behavior, among other effects. In addition, trazodone diminishes amphetamine-induced locomotor hyperactivity, although it does not inhibit apomorphine- or amphetamine-induced stereotypy. On the other hand, unlike antipsychotics, trazodone does not produce catalepsy, although it can do so at sufficiently high doses.

Activation of the serotonin 5-HT_{2A} receptor enhances striatal dopaminergic neurotransmission, while stimulation of the serotonin 5-HT_{2C} receptor inhibits striatal dopaminergic neurotransmission. Trazodone is both a serotonin 5-HT_{2A} and 5-HT_{2C} receptor antagonist, but has about 15-fold greater potency as an antagonist of the 5-HT_{2A} receptor relative to the 5-HT_{2C} receptor. In addition, at higher doses, trazodone acts as a dopamine D_{2} receptor antagonist in animals. As a result of the preceding actions, trazodone may inhibit striatal dopaminergic neurotransmission. This may underlie exacerbation of parkinsonism seen in marmosets and in human case reports.

==== Correspondence to clinical effects ====
Trazodone may act predominantly as a 5-HT_{2A} receptor antagonist to mediate its therapeutic benefits against anxiety and depression. Its inhibitory effects on serotonin reuptake and 5-HT_{2C} receptors are comparatively weak. In relation to these properties, trazodone does not have similar properties to selective serotonin reuptake inhibitors (SSRIs) and is not particularly associated with increased appetite and weight gain – unlike other 5-HT_{2C} antagonists like mirtazapine. Moderate 5-HT_{1A} partial agonism may contribute to trazodone's antidepressant and anxiolytic actions to some extent as well.

The combined actions of 5-HT_{2A} and 5HT_{2C} receptor antagonism with serotonin reuptake inhibition only occur at moderate to high doses of trazodone. Doses of trazodone lower than those effective for antidepressant action are frequently used for the effective treatment of insomnia. Low doses exploit trazodone's potent actions as a 5-HT_{2A} receptor antagonist, and its properties as an antagonist of H_{1} and α_{1}-adrenergic receptors, but do not adequately exploit its SERT or 5-HT_{2C} inhibition properties, which are weaker.

Since insomnia is one of the most frequent residual symptoms of depression after treatment with an SSRI, a hypnotic is often necessary for patients with a major depressive episode. Not only can a hypnotic potentially relieve the insomnia itself, but treating insomnia in patients with major depression may also increase remission rates due to the improvement of other symptoms such as loss of energy and depressed mood. Thus, the ability of low doses of trazodone to improve sleep in depressed patients may be an important mechanism whereby trazodone can augment the efficacy of other antidepressants.

Trazodone's potent α_{1}-adrenergic blockade may cause some side effects like orthostatic hypotension and sedation. Conversely, along with 5-HT_{2A} and H_{1} receptor antagonism, it may contribute to its efficacy as a hypnotic. Trazodone lacks any affinity for the muscarinic acetylcholine receptors, so does not produce anticholinergic side effects.

mCPP, a non-selective serotonin receptor modulator and serotonin releasing agent, is an active metabolite of trazodone and has been suggested to possibly play a role in its therapeutic benefits. However, research has not supported this hypothesis and mCPP might actually antagonize the efficacy of trazodone as well as produce additional side effects.

=== Pharmacokinetics ===
==== Absorption ====
Trazodone is well-absorbed after oral administration. Its bioavailability is 65 to 80%. Peak blood levels of trazodone occur 1 to 2 hours after ingestion and peak levels of the metabolite mCPP occur after 2 to 4 hours. Absorption is somewhat delayed and enhanced by food.

==== Distribution ====
Trazodone is not sequestered into any tissue. The medication is 89 to 95% protein-bound. The volume of distribution of trazodone is 0.8 to 1.5 L/kg. Trazodone is highly lipophilic.

==== Metabolism ====
The metabolic pathways involved in the metabolism are not well-characterized. In any case, the cytochrome P450 enzymes CYP3A4, CYP2D6, and CYP1A2 may all be involved to varying extents. Trazodone is known to be extensively metabolized by the liver via hydroxylation, N-oxidation, and N-dealkylation. Several metabolites of trazodone have been identified, including a dihydrodiol metabolite (via hydroxylation), a metabolite hydroxylated at the para position of the meta-chlorophenyl ring (via CYP2D6), oxotriazolepyridinepropionic acid (TPA) and mCPP (both via N-dealkylation of the piperazinyl nitrogen mediated by CYP3A4), and a metabolite formed by N-oxidation of the piperazinyl nitrogen.

CYP1A2, CYP2D6, and CYP3A4 genotypes all do not seem to predict concentrations of trazodone or mCPP. In any case, there are large interindividual variations in the metabolism of trazodone. In addition, poor metabolizers of dextromethorphan, a CYP2D6 substrate, eliminate mCPP more slowly and have higher concentrations of mCPP than extensive metabolizers.

mCPP is formed from trazodone by CYP3A4 and is metabolized via hydroxylation by CYP2D6 (to a para-hydroxylated metabolite). It may contribute to the pharmacological actions of trazodone. mCPP levels are only 10% of those of trazodone during therapy with trazodone, but is nonetheless present at concentrations known to produce psychic and physical effects in humans when mCPP has been administered alone. In any case, the actions of trazodone, such as its serotonin antagonism, might partially overwhelm those of mCPP. As a consequence of the production of mCPP as a metabolite, patients administered trazodone may test positive on EMIT II urine tests for the presence of MDMA ("ecstasy").

==== Elimination ====
The elimination of trazodone is biphasic: the first phase's half-life (distribution) is 3 to 6 hours, and the following phase's half-life (elimination) is 4.1 to 14.6 hours. The elimination half-life of extended-release trazodone is 9.1 to 13.2 hours. The elimination half-life of mCPP is 2.6 to 16.0 hours and is longer than that of trazodone. Metabolites are conjugated to gluconic acid or glutathione and around 70 to 75% of ^{14}C-labelled trazodone was found to be excreted in the urine within 72 hours. The remaining drug and its metabolites are excreted in the faeces via biliary elimination. Less than 1% of the drug is excreted in its unchanged form. After an oral dose of trazodone, it was found to be excreted 20% in the urine as TPA and conjugates, 9% as the dihydrodiol metabolite, and less than 1% as unconjugated mCPP. mCPP is glucuronidated and sulfated similarly to other trazodone metabolites.

== Chemistry ==
Trazodone is a triazolopyridine derivative and a phenylpiperazine that is structurally related to nefazodone and etoperidone, each of which is a derivative of it.

== History ==
Trazodone was developed in Italy, in the 1960s, by Angelini Research Laboratories as a second-generation antidepressant. It was developed according to the mental pain hypothesis, which was postulated from studying patients and which proposes that major depression is associated with a decreased pain threshold. In sharp contrast to most other antidepressants available at the time of its development, trazodone showed minimal effects on muscarinic cholinergic receptors. Trazodone was patented and marketed in many countries all over the world, starting with Italy in 1972 and West Germany in 1977. It was approved by the Food and Drug Administration (FDA) in 1981 and was the first non-tricyclic or MAOI antidepressant approved in the US.

== Society and culture ==
=== Generic names ===
Trazodone is the generic name of the drug and its INN, BAN, and DCF, while trazodone hydrochloride is its USAN, USP, BANM, and JAN.

=== Brand names ===
Trazodone has been marketed under a large number of brand names throughout the world. Major brand names include Desyrel (worldwide), Donaren (Brazil), Molipaxin (Ireland, United Kingdom), Oleptro (United States), Trazorel (Canada), and Trittico (worldwide).

== Research ==
Trazodone may be effective in the treatment of sexual dysfunction, for instance female sexual dysfunction and erectile dysfunction. A 2003 systematic review and meta-analysis found some indication that trazodone may be useful in the treatment of erectile dysfunction. Besides trazodone alone, a combination of trazodone and bupropion (developmental code names and tentative brand names S1P-104, S1P-205, Lorexys, and Orexa) is under development for the treatment of erectile dysfunction and female sexual dysfunction. As of September 2021, it is in phase 2 clinical trials for these indications. It has been in this stage of clinical development since at least February 2015.

Trazodone may be useful in the treatment of certain symptoms like sleep disturbances in alcohol withdrawal and recovery. However, reviews have recommended against use of trazodone for alcohol withdrawal due to inadequate evidence. Very limited evidence suggests that trazodone might be useful in the treatment of certain symptoms in cocaine use disorder. Trazodone has been reported to be effective in the treatment of sleep apnea. Cochrane reviews found that trazodone was not effective in the treatment of agitation in dementia. Another Cochrane review found that trazodone might be useful in the treatment of sleep disturbances in dementia. Further systematic reviews have found that trazodone may be effective for behavioral and psychological symptoms in dementias such as frontotemporal dementia and Alzheimer's disease.

Trazodone has been studied as an adjunctive therapy in the treatment of schizophrenia. It has been reported to decrease negative symptoms without worsening positive symptoms although improvement in negative symptoms was modest. Trazodone has also been reported to be effective in treating antipsychotic-related extrapyramidal symptoms such as akathisia. Trazodone has been studied and reported to be effective in the treatment of bulimia, but there is limited evidence to support this use. It might be useful in the treatment of night eating disorder as well. Trazodone might be effective in the treatment of adjustment disorder. It may also be effective in the treatment of bruxism in children and adolescents.

Trazodone may be useful in the treatment of certain chronic pain disorders. There is limited but conflicting evidence to support the use of trazodone in the treatment of headaches and migraines in children. Trazodone may be useful in the treatment of fibromyalgia as well as diabetic neuropathy. It may also be useful in the treatment of burning mouth syndrome. A 2004 narrative review claimed that trazodone could be used in the treatment of complex regional pain syndrome. Trazodone may also be effective in the treatment of functional gastrointestinal disorders. It may be effective in the treatment of non-cardiac chest pain as well.

Trazodone may be useful in promoting motor recovery after stroke.

Trazodone is sometimes prescribed to treat premature ejaculation but clomipramine and paroxetine may be more effective.

== Veterinary use ==
Trazodone has been used to reduce anxiety and stress, to improve sleep, and to produce sedation in dogs and cats in veterinary medicine.

== See also ==
- List of antidepressants
