= Serotonin modulator and stimulator =

Class of antidepressant medication

A serotonin modulator and stimulator (SMS), sometimes referred to more simply as a serotonin modulator, is a type of drug with a multimodal action specific to the serotonin neurotransmitter system. To be precise, SMSs simultaneously modulate one or more serotonin receptors and inhibit the reuptake of serotonin. The term was created to describe the mechanism of action of the serotonergic antidepressant vortioxetine, which acts as a serotonin reuptake inhibitor (SRI), agonist of the 5-HT_{1A} receptor, and antagonist of the 5-HT_{3} and 5-HT_{7} receptors. However, it can also technically be applied to vilazodone, which is an antidepressant as well and acts as an SRI and 5-HT_{1A} receptor partial agonist.

SMSs were developed because there are many different subtypes of serotonin receptors (at least 15 in total are currently known) and not all of these receptors appear to be involved in the antidepressant effects of SRIs. Some serotonin receptors seem to play a relatively neutral or insignificant role in the regulation of mood, but others, such as 5-HT_{1A} autoreceptors and 5-HT_{7} receptors, appear to play an important role in the efficacy of SRIs in treating depression. As such, a drug which combines the actions of, say, an SRI, 5-HT_{1A} partial agonism, and 5-HT_{7} receptor antagonism, could, in theory, have the potential to prove more effective than pure SRIs. Alternatively, antagonism of 5-HT_{3} – a receptor that is involved in the regulation of nausea, vomiting, and the gastrointestinal tract – could counteract the undesirable increase in activation of this receptor mediated by SRIs, thereby potentially improving tolerability.

An alternative term is serotonin partial agonist/reuptake inhibitor (SPARI), which can be applied only to vilazodone.

It is similar to the marketing strategy used for the drug brexpiprazole, labeling it as a "serotonin-dopamine activity modulator" or 'SDAM'.

== See also ==
- List of antidepressants
- Serotonin antagonist and reuptake inhibitor (SARI)
- Selective serotonin reuptake inhibitor (SSRI)
- Noradrenergic and specific serotonergic antidepressant (NaSSA)
- Tricyclic antidepressant (TCAs)
