= Vortioxetine =

Serotonin modulator antidepressant

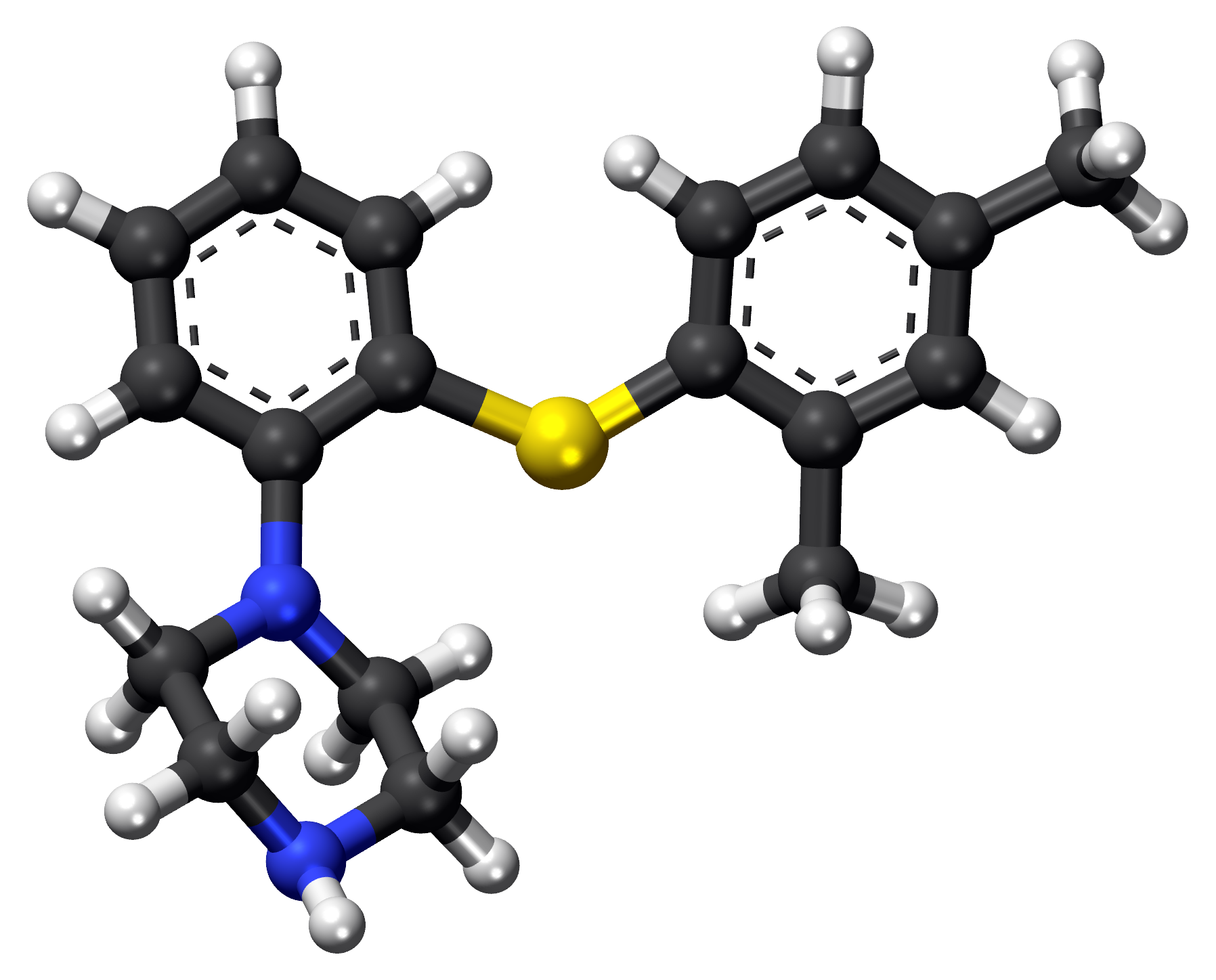

Clinical data
- Pronunciation: /vɔːrtiˈɒksətiːn/ vor-tee-OK-sə-teen
- Trade names: Trintellix, Brintellix, others
- Other names: Lu AA21004, Vortioxetine hydrobromide (JAN JP), Vortioxetine hydrobromide (USAN US)
- AHFS/Drugs.com: Monograph
- MedlinePlus: a614003
- License data: US DailyMed: Vortioxetine
- Pregnancy category: AU: B3
- Routes of administration: By mouth
- Drug class: Serotonin modulator and stimulator (SMS)
- ATC code: N06AX26 (WHO)

Legal status
- Legal status: AU: S4 (Prescription only); BR: Class C1 (Other controlled substances); CA: ℞-only; UK: POM (Prescription only); US: ℞-only; EU: Rx-only; In general: ℞ (Prescription only)

Pharmacokinetic data
- Bioavailability: 75% (peak at 7–11 hours)
- Protein binding: 98–99%
- Metabolism: Liver, primarily CYP2D6-mediated oxidation
- Elimination half-life: 66 hours
- Excretion: 59% in urine, 26% in feces

Identifiers
- IUPAC name: 1-[2-(2,4-Dimethyl-phenylsulfanyl)phenyl]piperazine
- CAS Number: 508233-74-7
- PubChem CID: 9966051
- IUPHAR/BPS: 7351
- DrugBank: DB09068
- ChemSpider: 8141643
- UNII: 3O2K1S3WQV; as salt: TKS641KOAY
- KEGG: D10184; as salt: D10185
- ChEBI: CHEBI:76016
- ChEMBL: ChEMBL2204360
- CompTox Dashboard (EPA): DTXSID80965062
- ECHA InfoCard: 100.258.748

Chemical and physical data
- Formula: C_{18}H_{22}N_{2}S
- Molar mass: 298.45 g·mol^{−1}
- 3D model (JSmol): Interactive image
- SMILES: CC(C=C(C)C=C1)=C1SC2=C(N3CCNCC3)C=CC=C2
- InChI: InChI=1S/C18H22N2S/c1-14-7-8-17(15(2)13-14)21-18-6-4-3-5-16(18)20-11-9-19-10-12-20/h3-8,13,19H,9-12H2,1-2H3; Key:YQNWZWMKLDQSAC-UHFFFAOYSA-N

Vortioxetine, sold under the brand names Trintellix (in the US) and Brintellix (in Europe) among others, is an antidepressant medication of the serotonin modulator and stimulator (SMS) class used in the treatment of major depressive disorder. Its effectiveness is viewed as similar to that of other antidepressants. It is taken orally.

Common side effects include nausea, dry mouth, diarrhea, constipation, vomiting (3-6% of people), and sexual dysfunction. Serious side effects may include suicide in those under the age of 25, serotonin syndrome, coagulopathy, mania, and SIADH. A withdrawal syndrome may occur if the medication is abruptly stopped or the dose is decreased. Use during pregnancy and breastfeeding is not generally recommended. Vortioxetine's mechanism of action is not entirely understood, but is believed to be related to increasing serotonin levels and possibly interacting with certain serotonin receptors.

It was approved for medical use in the United States and in the European Union in 2013. In 2020, it was the 243rd most commonly prescribed medication in the United States, with more than 1 million prescriptions.

== Medical uses ==
Vortioxetine is used as a treatment for major depressive disorder, with its effectiveness shown to be similar to other antidepressants and its effect size has been described as modest. Vortioxetine may be used when other treatments have failed. A 2017 Cochrane review on vortioxetine determined that its place in the treatment of severe depression is unclear due to low-quality evidence and that more studies comparing vortioxetine to selective serotonin reuptake inhibitors (SSRIs), the typical first-line treatments, are needed. Vortioxetine appears to work in depressed patients with anxiety.

Vortioxetine is also used off label for anxiety. A 2016 review found it was not useful in generalized anxiety disorder at 2.5, 5.0, and 10 mg doses (15 and 20 mg doses were not tested). A 2019 meta-analysis found that vortioxetine did not produce statistically significant results over placebo in the symptoms, quality of life, and remission rates of generalized anxiety disorder, but it was well-tolerated. However, a 2018 meta-analysis supported use and efficacy of vortioxetine for generalized anxiety disorder, though stated that more research was necessary to strengthen the evidence. A 2021 systematic review and meta-analysis concluded that there was uncertainty about the effectiveness of vortioxetine for anxiety due to existing evidence being of very low-quality.

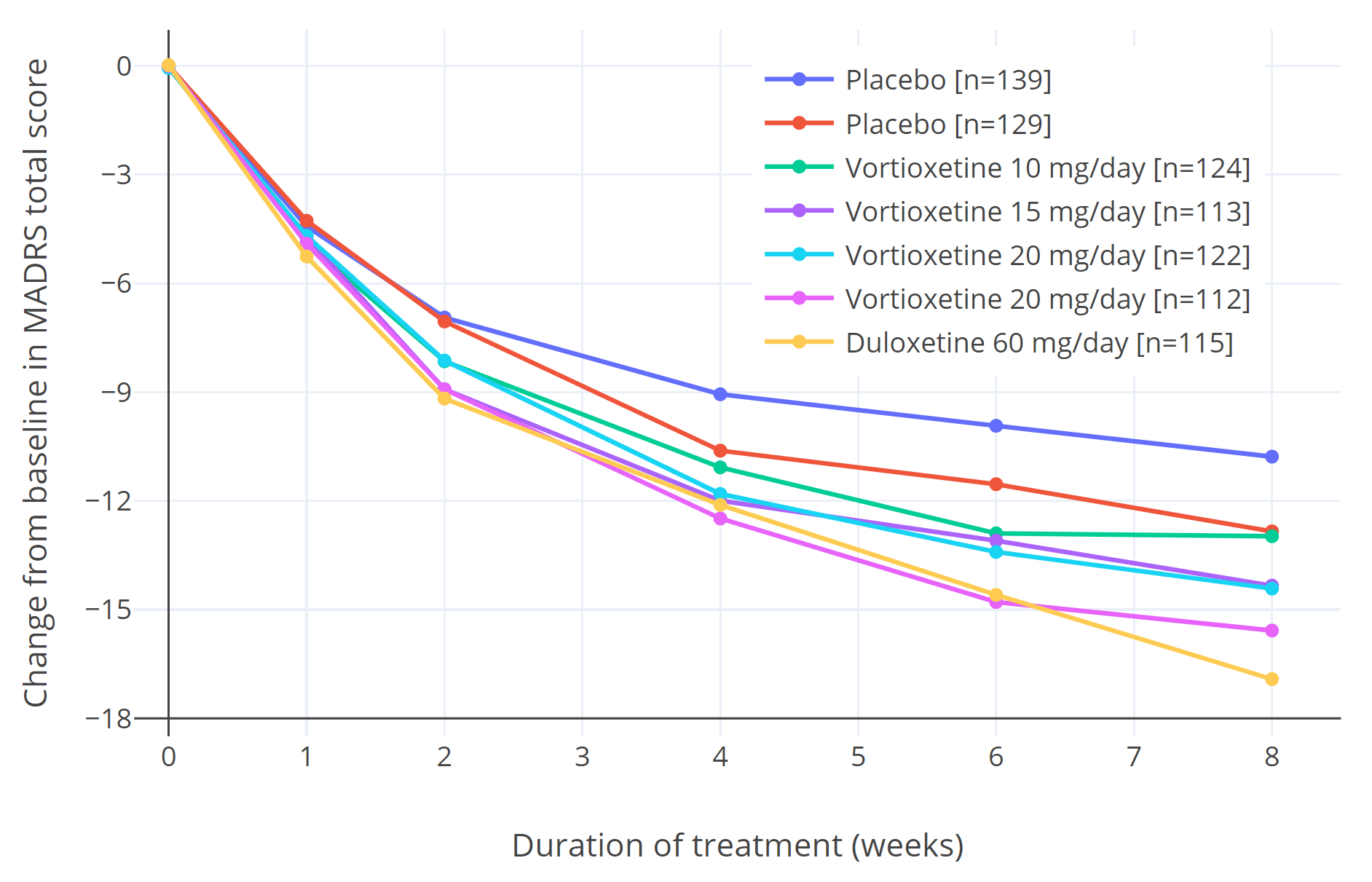
Effectiveness of vortioxetine at 10, 15, and 20 mg/day versus placebo and duloxetine at 60 mg/day in the treatment of major depressive disorder in adults over 8 weeks (measured by improvement on the Montgomery–Åsberg Depression Rating Scale) in two randomized controlled trials. Changes in MADRS total score from baseline at week 8 were –10.8 to –12.8 for placebo, –13.0 to –15.6 for vortioxetine, and –16.9 for duloxetine.

== Contraindications ==
Vortioxetine is contraindicated in those taking monoamine oxidase inhibitors (MAOIs), due to the possibility of serotonin syndrome.

== Adverse effects ==
Side effects of vortioxetine at different doses in clinical trials
Side effect	Placebo	Vortioxetine				Duloxetine
Side effect	Placebo	5 mg/day	10 mg/day	15 mg/day	20 mg/day	60 mg/day
Any	62%	66%	67%	70%	73%	77%
Nausea	9%	21%	26%	32%	32%	36%
Vomiting	1%	3%	5%	6%	6%	4%
Diarrhea	6%	7%	7%	10%	7%	?
Constipation	3%	3%	5%	6%	6%	10%
Dry mouth	6%	7%	7%	6%	8%	?
Flatulence	1%	1%	3%	2%	1%	?
Dizziness	6%	6%	6%	8%	9%	?
Abnormal dreams	1%	<1%	<1%	2%	3%	?
Itching	1%	1%	2%	3%	3%	?
Notes: Vortioxetine and duloxetine (an SNRI) were directly compared in randomized clinical trials. Other reported side effects of vortioxetine in clinical trials included headache, nasal symptoms, somnolence, and excessive sweating.

The most common side effects reported with vortioxetine are nausea, vomiting, constipation, and sexual dysfunction, among others. With the exceptions of nausea and sexual dysfunction, these side effects were reported by less than or equal to 10% of study participants given vortioxetine. Significant percentages of placebo-treated participants also report these side effects. Discontinuation of treatment due to adverse effects in clinical trials was 8% with vortioxetine versus 3% with placebo.

Sexual dysfunction, such as decreased libido, abnormal orgasm, delayed ejaculation, and erectile dysfunction, are well-known side effects of SSRIs and serotonin–norepinephrine reuptake inhibitors (SNRIs). In clinical trials, sexual dysfunction occurred more often with vortioxetine than with placebo and appeared to be dose-dependent. Incidence of treatment-emergent sexual dysfunction as measured with the Arizona Sexual Experience Scale (ASEX) were 14 to 20% for placebo and 16 to 34% for vortioxetine over a dosage range of 5 to 20 mg/day. The incidence of sexual dysfunction with vortioxetine was similar to that with the SNRI duloxetine, which had an incidence of 26 to 28% at the used dosage of 60 mg/day. However, treatment-emergent sexual dysfunction caused by a prior SSRI was better improved by switching to vortioxetine than by switching to the SSRI escitalopram. In another study, vortioxetine at a dosage of 10 mg/day though not at 20 mg/day produced less sexual dysfunction than the SSRI paroxetine. These findings suggest that although vortioxetine can still cause sexual dysfunction itself, it may cause somewhat less sexual dysfunction than SSRIs and might be a useful alternative option for people experiencing sexual dysfunction with these medications. The rates of spontaneously reported sexual dysfunction are much lower than those obtained when researchers specifically ask subjects about sexual dysfunction (using the ASEX rating scale).

Sexual dysfunction with vortioxetine at different doses in clinical trials
Quantification method	Group	Placebo	Vortioxetine				Duloxetine
Quantification method	Group	Placebo	5 mg/day	10 mg/day	15 mg/day	20 mg/day	60 mg/day
Measured by ASEX	Men	14%	16%	20%	19%	29%	26%
Measured by ASEX	Women	20%	22%	23%	33%	34%	28%
Spontaneously reported	Men	2%	3%	4%	4%	5%	?
Spontaneously reported	Women	<1%	<1%	1%	<1%	2%	?
Notes: Vortioxetine and duloxetine (an SNRI) were directly compared in randomized clinical trials.

Based on preliminary clinical studies, vortioxetine may cause less emotional blunting than SSRIs and SNRIs.

Vortioxetine used in combination with other serotonergic drugs such as MAOIs or SSRIs may result in serotonin syndrome.

== Interactions ==
Vortioxetine is metabolized primarily by the cytochrome P450 enzyme CYP2D6. Inhibitors and inducers of CYP2D6 may modify the pharmacokinetics of vortioxetine and necessitate dosage adjustments.

Bupropion, a strong CYP2D6 inhibitor, has been found to increase peak levels of vortioxetine by 2.1-fold and total vortioxetine levels by 2.3-fold (bupropion dosed at 300 mg/day and vortioxetine dosed at 10 mg/day). The incidence of side effects with vortioxetine, like nausea, headache, vomiting, and insomnia, was correspondingly increased with the combination. Other strong CYP2D6 inhibitors, like fluoxetine, paroxetine, and quinidine, may have similar influences on the pharmacokinetics of vortioxetine, and it is recommended that the dosage of vortioxetine be reduced by half when it is administered in combination with such medications. Lesser interactions have additionally been identified for vortioxetine with the cytochrome P450 inhibitors ketoconazole and fluconazole.

Rifampicin, a strong and broad cytochrome P450 inducer (though notably not of CYP2D6), has been found to decrease peak levels of vortioxetine by 51% and total levels of vortioxetine by 72% (rifampicin dosed at 600 mg/day and vortioxetine at 20 mg/day). Similar influences on vortioxetine pharmacokinetics may also occur with other strong cytochrome P450 inducers including carbamazepine and phenytoin. As such, increasing vortioxetine dosage should be considered when it is given in combination with strong cytochrome P450 inducers. The maximum recommended dose should not exceed three times the original vortioxetine dose.

Vortioxetine and its metabolites show no meaningful interactions with a variety of assessed cytochrome P450 enzymes and transporters (e.g., P-glycoprotein), hence vortioxetine is not expected to influence the pharmacokinetics of other medications importantly.

The combination of vortioxetine with MAOIs, including other MAOIs such as linezolid and intravenous methylene blue, may cause serotonin syndrome and is contraindicated. The risk of serotonin syndrome may also be increased when vortioxetine is combined with other serotonergic drugs, like SSRIs, SNRIs, tricyclic antidepressants (TCAs), triptans, tramadol, tryptophan, buspirone, St John's wort, fentanyl, and lithium, among others. However, vortioxetine is not considered to be contraindicated with serotonergic medications besides MAOIs.

== Pharmacology ==
=== Pharmacodynamics ===
Activities of vortioxetine at human molecular targets
Target	Affinity	Functional activity		Action
Target	K_{i} (nM)	IC_{50} / EC_{50} (nM)	IA (%)	Action
SERT	1.6	5.4	–	Inhibition
NET	113	–	–	Inhibition
5-HT_{1A}	15	200	96	Agonist
5-HT_{1B}	33	120	55	Partial agonist
5-HT_{1D}	54	370	–	Antagonist
5-HT_{2C}	180	–	–	–
5-HT_{3A}	3.7	12	–	Antagonist
5-HT_{7}	19	450	–	Antagonist
β_{1}-adr.	46	–	–	Antagonist
Note: No significant activities at 70 other molecular targets (>1,000 nM) (including, e.g., the DAT). Sources:

Vortioxetine increases serotonin concentrations in the brain by inhibiting its reuptake in the synapse, and also modulates (activates or blocks) certain serotonin receptors. This puts it in the class of serotonin modulators and stimulators, which also includes vilazodone. More specifically, vortioxetine is a serotonin reuptake inhibitor, agonist of the serotonin 5-HT_{1A} receptor, partial agonist of the 5-HT_{1B} receptor, and antagonist of the serotonin 5-HT_{1D}, 5-HT_{3}, and 5-HT_{7} receptors, as well as an apparent ligand of the β_{1}-adrenergic receptor. In terms of functional activity however, vortioxetine appears to be much more potent on serotonin reuptake inhibition and 5-HT_{3} receptor antagonism than for its interactions with the other serotonin receptors. Whereas vortioxetine has IC_{50} or EC_{50} values of 5.4 nM for the SERT and 12 nM for the 5-HT_{3} receptor, its values are 120 to 450 nM for the 5-HT_{1A}, 5-HT_{1B}, 5-HT_{1D}, and 5-HT_{7} receptors. This translates to about 22- to 83-fold selectivity for SERT inhibition and 10- to 38-fold selectivity for 5-HT_{3} antagonism over activities at the other serotonin receptors. 5-HT_{3} antagonism appears to have a better effect on REM sleep compared to paroxetine.

The serotonin transporter (SERT) and 5-HT_{3} receptor are claimed to be primarily occupied at lower clinical doses of vortioxetine and that the 5-HT_{1B}, 5-HT_{1A}, and 5-HT_{7} receptors may additionally be occupied at higher doses. Occupancy of the serotonin transporter with vortioxetine in young men was found to be highest in the raphe nucleus with median occupancies of 25%, 53%, and 98% after 9 days of administration with 2.5, 10, and 60 mg/day vortioxetine. In another study, serotonin transporter occupancy in men was 50%, 65%, and ≥80% for 5, 10, and 20 mg/day vortioxetine respectively.

Vortioxetine at 5 mg/day may produce antidepressant effects and result in SERT occupancy as low as 50%. This is in apparent contrast to SSRIs and SNRIs, which appear to require a minimum of 70 to 80% occupancy for antidepressant efficacy. These findings are suggestive that the antidepressant effects of vortioxetine may be mediated by serotonin receptor interactions in addition to serotonin reuptake inhibition. A study found no significant occupancy of the 5-HT_{1A} receptor with vortioxetine at 30 mg/day for 9 days, which suggests that at least this specific serotonin receptor may not be involved in the clinical pharmacology of vortioxetine. However, methodological concerns were noted that may limit the interpretability of this result. Occupancy of other serotonin receptors like 5-HT_{3} and 5-HT_{7} by vortioxetine in humans does not seem to have been studied. In relation to the preceding, the contribution of serotonin receptor interactions to the antidepressant effects of vortioxetine is unknown and remains to be established. Uncertainties remain about whether vortioxetine is indeed a clinically multimodal antidepressant or whether it is effectively "[just] another selective serotonin reuptake inhibitor".

Antagonism of the 5-HT_{3} receptor has been found to enhance the increase in brain serotonin levels produced by serotonin reuptake inhibition in animal studies. Whether or not the 5-HT_{3} receptor antagonism of vortioxetine likewise does this in humans or contributes to its clinical antidepressant efficacy is unclear. SSRIs and 5-HT_{1A} receptor agonists often produce nausea as a side effect, whereas 5-HT_{3} receptor antagonists like ondansetron are antiemetics and have been found to be effective in treating SSRI-induced nausea. It was thought that the 5-HT_{3} receptor antagonism of vortioxetine would reduce the incidence of nausea relative to SSRIs. However, clinical trials found significant and dose-dependent rates of nausea with vortioxetine that appeared to be comparable to those found with the SNRI duloxetine.

Vortioxetine has been found to slightly reduce oxytocin levels in rodents. Serotonin 5-HT_{1A} receptor agonists can enhance oxytocin release, but vortioxetine shows 10- to 15-fold lower affinity for the serotonin 5-HT_{1A} receptor in rodents compared to humans.

=== Pharmacokinetics ===
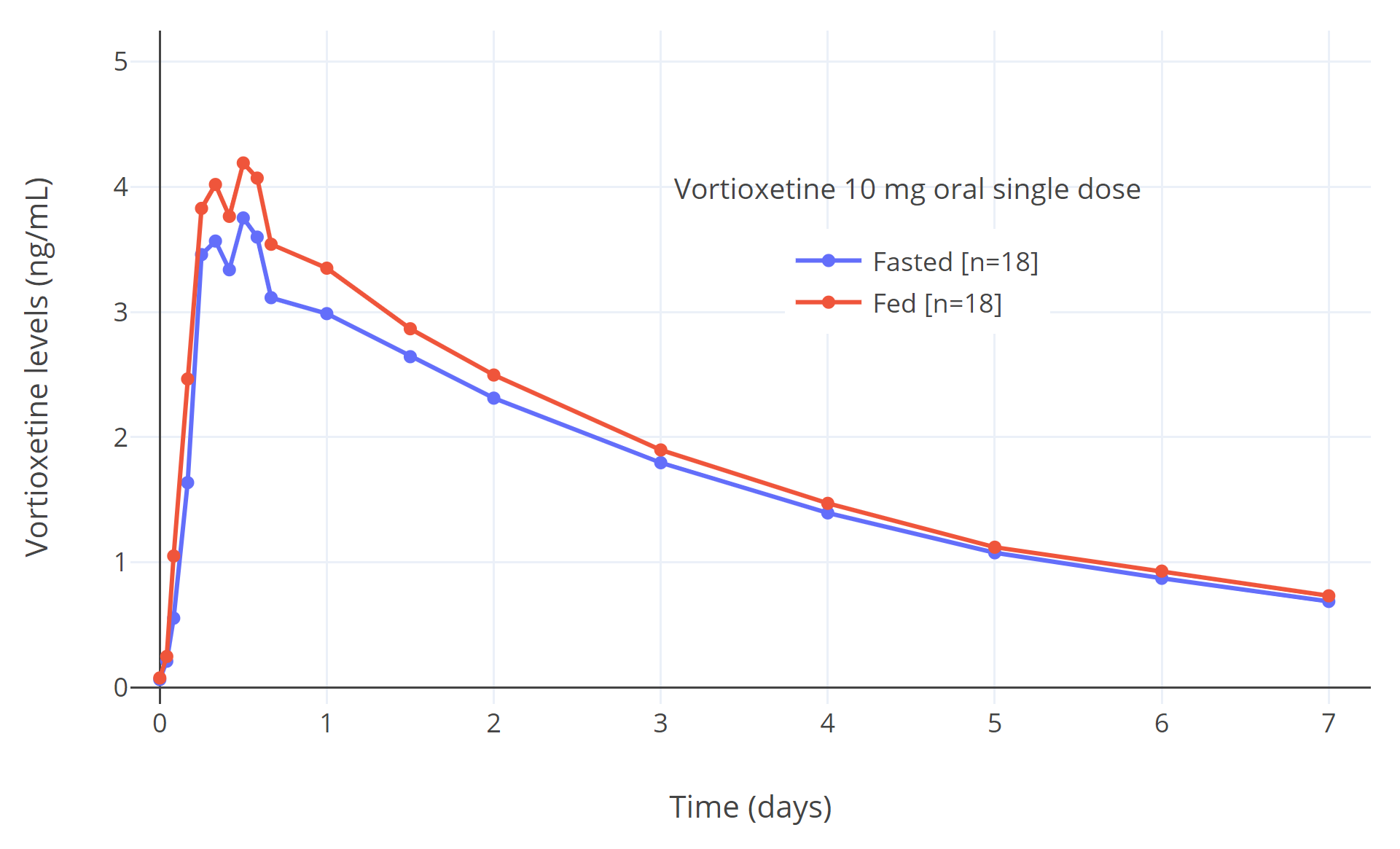
Vortioxetine levels after a single 10 mg oral dose of vortioxetine in 18 fasted and 18 fed healthy Japanese adults.

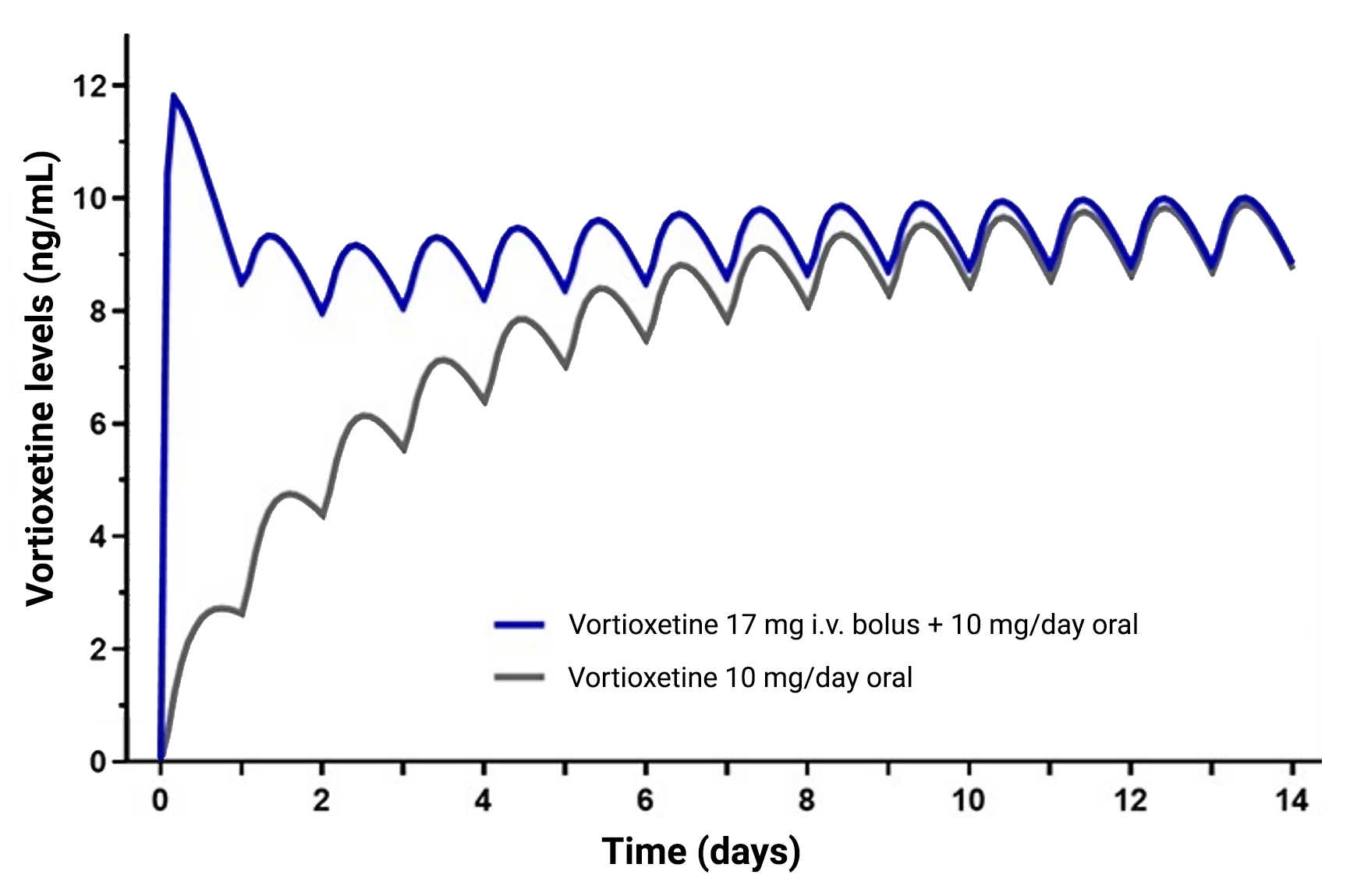
Simulation of vortioxetine levels and accumulation with 10 mg/day oral vortioxetine plus a 17 mg intravenous bolus of vortioxetine versus 10 mg/day oral vortioxetine alone.

Vortioxetine is well-absorbed when taken orally and has an oral bioavailability of 75%. It is systemically detectable after a single oral dose by 0.781 hours. Peak levels of vortioxetine are reached within 7 to 11 hours post-dose with single or multiple doses. Steady-state levels of vortioxetine are generally reached within 2 weeks of administration, with 90% of individuals reaching 90% of steady state after 12 days of administration. Steady-state peak levels of vortioxetine with doses of 5, 10, and 20 mg/day were 9, 18, and 33 ng/mL, respectively. The accumulation index of vortioxetine (area-under-the-curve levels after a single dose versus at steady state) is 5 to 6. A loading dose given intravenously has been found to achieve steady-state levels more rapidly with oral vortioxetine therapy. The pharmacokinetics of vortioxetine are known to be linear and dose proportional over a range of 2.5 to 75 mg for single doses and 2.5 to 60 mg for multiple doses. Food has no influence on the pharmacokinetics of vortioxetine.

The apparent volume of distribution of vortioxetine is large and ranges from 2,500 to 3,400 L after single or multiple doses of 5 to 20 mg vortioxetine, with extensive extravascular distribution. The plasma protein binding of vortioxetine is approximately 98 or 99%, with about 1.25 ± 0.48% free or unbound.

Vortioxetine is extensively metabolized by oxidation via cytochrome P450 enzymes and subsequent glucuronidation via UDP-glucuronosyltransferase. CYP2D6 is the primary enzyme involved in the metabolism of vortioxetine, but others including CYP2A6, CYP2B6, CYP2C8, CYP2C9, CYP2C19, and CYP3A4/5 are also involved. It is also metabolized by alcohol dehydrogenase, aldehyde dehydrogenase, and aldehyde oxidase. Six metabolites of vortioxetine have been identified. The major metabolite of vortioxetine (Lu AA34443) is inactive and its minor active metabolite (Lu AA39835) is not thought to cross the blood–brain barrier. The remaining metabolites are glucuronide conjugates. Hence, vortioxetine itself is thought to be primarily responsible for its pharmacological activity.

The estimated total clearance of vortioxetine ranges from 30 to 41 L/h. The elimination half-life of vortioxetine is 66 hours, with a range of 59 to 69 hours after single or multiple doses. Elimination of vortioxetine is almost entirely via the liver (99%) rather than the kidneys (<1%). Approximately 85% of vortioxetine was recovered in a single-dose excretion study after 15 days, with 59% in urine and 26% in feces.

=== Pharmacogenomics ===
Genetic variations in cytochrome P450 enzymes can influence exposure to vortioxetine. CYP2D6 extensive metabolizers have approximately 2-fold higher clearance of vortioxetine than CYP2D6 poor metabolizers. The estimated clearance rates were 52.9, 34.1, 26.6, and 18.1 L/h for CYP2D6 ultra-rapid metabolizers, extensive metabolizers, intermediate metabolizers, and poor metabolizers. Area-under-the-curve levels of vortioxetine were 35.5% lower in CYP2D6 ultra-rapid metabolizers than in extensive metabolizers, though with significant overlap due to interindividual variability. Dosage adjustment for CYP2D6 ultra-rapid metabolizers is considered to not be necessary. Vortioxetine exposure in CYP2D6 poor metabolizers is expected to be approximately twice as high as in extensive metabolizers. Depending on the individual response, dosage adjustment may be considered for CYP2D6 poor metabolizers, with a maximum recommended dosage of 10 mg/day for known such individuals. In addition to CYP2D6, CYP2C19 extensive metabolizers have 1.4-fold higher clearance of vortioxetine than poor metabolizers. However, this is not considered to be clinically important and dose adjustment is not considered to be necessary based on CYP2C19 status.

== Chemistry ==
Vortioxetine (1-[2-(2,4-dimethylphenylsulfanyl)phenyl]piperazine) is a bis-aryl-sulfanyl amine as well as piperazine derivative. The acid dissociation constant (pKa) values for vortioxetine hydrobromide were determined to be 9.1 (± 0.1) and 3.0 (± 0.2) according to an Australian Public Assessment Report.

== History ==
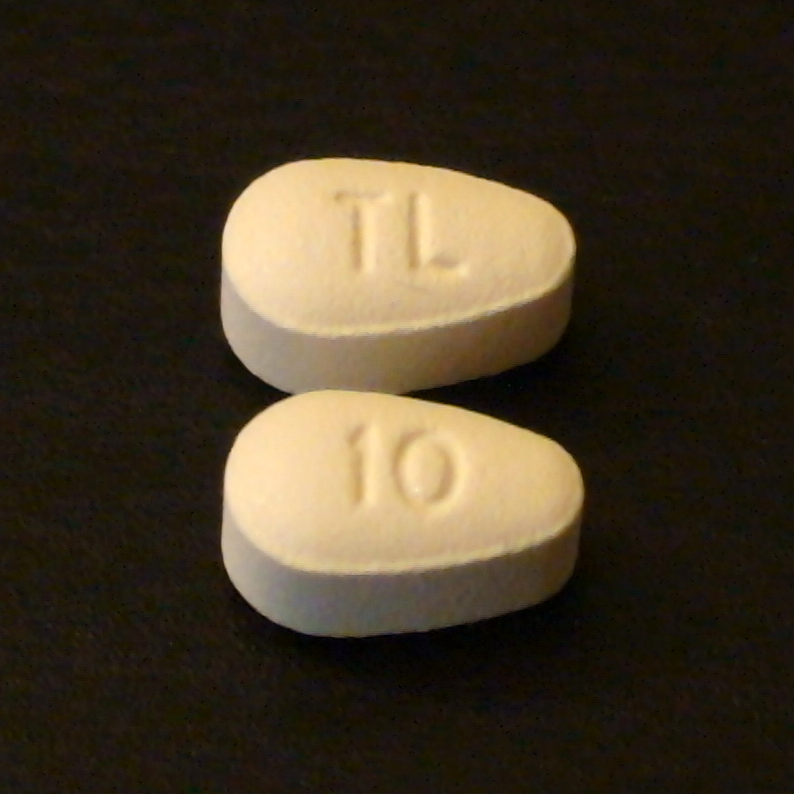
Vortioxetine 10 mg tablets (Trintellix).

Vortioxetine was invented by scientists at Lundbeck who reported the rationale and synthesis for the drug (then called Lu AA21004) in a 2011 paper.

In 2007, the compound was in Phase II clinical trials, and Lundbeck and Takeda entered into a partnership in which Takeda paid Lundbeck $40 million up-front, with promises of up to $345 million in milestone payments, and Takeda agreed to pay most of the remaining cost of developing the drug. The companies agreed to co-promote the drug in the US and Japan, and that Lundbeck would receive a royalty on all such sales. The deal included another drug candidate, tedatioxetine (Lu AA24530), and could be expanded to include two other Lundbeck compounds.

Vortioxetine was approved by the US Food and Drug Administration (FDA) for the treatment of major depressive disorder (MDD) in adults in September 2013, and it was approved in the European Union in December 2013.

== Society and culture ==
It is manufactured by the pharmaceutical companies Lundbeck and Takeda.

=== Names ===
Vortioxetine was previously sold under the brand name Brintellix in the United States, but in May 2016, the US Food and Drug Administration (FDA) approved a name change to Trintellix in order to avoid confusion with the blood-thinning medication Brilinta (ticagrelor). Other brand names include Torvox, Vantaxa, Voxigain, Trivoxetin, Vipca, Vortica, Vatoin, Xomat, Vortidif.

== Research ==
Vortioxetine was under development for the treatment of generalized anxiety disorder and attention deficit hyperactivity disorder but development for these indications was discontinued. As of August 2021, vortioxetine remains in development for the treatment of anxiety disorders, binge-eating disorder, and bipolar disorder. It is in phase II clinical trials for these indications. There is also interest in vortioxetine for the potential treatment of social anxiety disorder, neuropathic pain, and for cognitive enhancement in major depression.
