= Acamprosate =

Medication

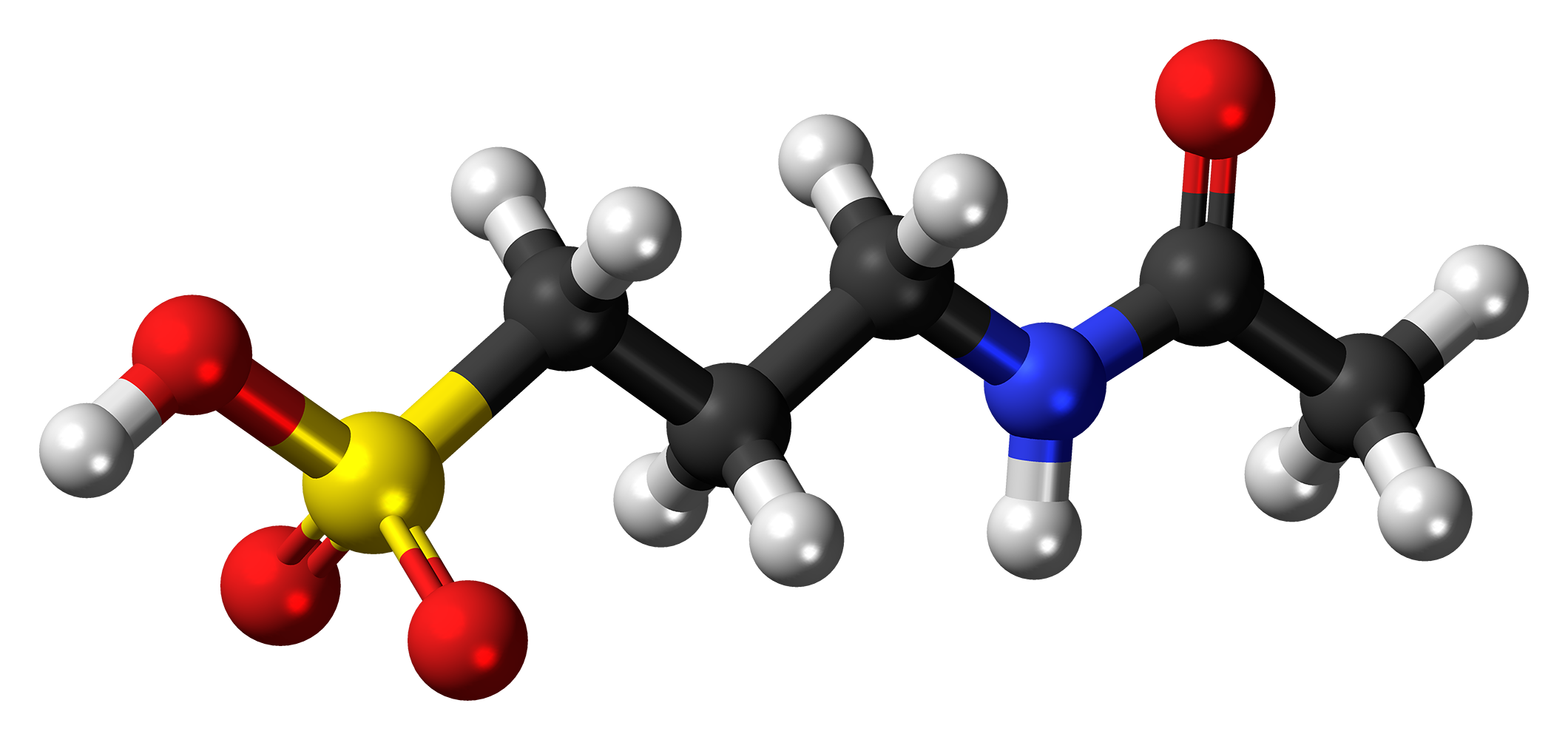

Clinical data
- Pronunciation: /əˈkæmproʊseɪt/
- Trade names: Campral, Campral EC
- Other names: N-Acetyl homotaurine, Ca2+ bis-acetyl-homotaurinate, acamprosate calcium (JAN JP), acamprosate calcium (USAN US)
- AHFS/Drugs.com: Monograph
- License data: US DailyMed: Acamprosate
- Pregnancy category: AU: B2
- Routes of administration: By mouth
- ATC code: N07BB03 (WHO)

Legal status
- Legal status: AU: S4 (Prescription only); UK: POM (Prescription only); US: ℞-only

Pharmacokinetic data
- Bioavailability: 11%
- Protein binding: Negligible
- Metabolism: Nil
- Elimination half-life: 20–33 hours
- Excretion: Kidney

Identifiers
- IUPAC name: 3-Acetamidopropane-1-sulfonic acid
- CAS Number: 77337-76-9
- PubChem CID: 155434
- IUPHAR/BPS: 7106
- DrugBank: DB00659
- ChemSpider: 136929
- UNII: N4K14YGM3J
- KEGG: D07058
- ChEBI: CHEBI:51042
- ChEMBL: ChEMBL1201293
- CompTox Dashboard (EPA): DTXSID3044259
- ECHA InfoCard: 100.071.495

Chemical and physical data
- Formula: C_{5}H_{11}NO_{4}S
- Molar mass: 181.21 g·mol^{−1}
- 3D model (JSmol): Interactive image
- SMILES: [Ca+2].O=C(NCCCS(=O)(=O)[O-])C.[O-]S(=O)(=O)CCCNC(=O)C
- InChI: InChI=1S/2C5H11NO4S.Ca/c2*1-5(7)6-3-2-4-11(8,9)10;/h2*2-4H2,1H3,(H,6,7)(H,8,9,10);/q;;+2/p-2; Key:BUVGWDNTAWHSKI-UHFFFAOYSA-L

Acamprosate, sold under the brand name Campral, is a medication which reduces cravings in alcoholism. It is thought to stabilize chemical signaling in the brain that would otherwise be disrupted by alcohol withdrawal. When used alone, acamprosate is not an effective therapy for alcohol use disorder in most individuals, as it only addresses withdrawal symptoms and not addiction. It facilitates a reduction in alcohol consumption as well as full abstinence when used in combination with psychosocial support or other drugs that address the addictive behavior.

Serious side effects include allergic reactions, abnormal heart rhythms, and low or high blood pressure, while less serious side effects include headaches, insomnia, and impotence. Diarrhea is the most common side effect. It is unclear if use is safe during pregnancy.

It is on the World Health Organization's List of Essential Medicines.

== Medical uses ==
Acamprosate is useful when used along with counseling in the treatment of alcohol use disorder. Over three to twelve months it increases the number of people who do not drink at all and the number of days without alcohol. It appears to work as well as naltrexone for maintenance of abstinence from alcohol, however naltrexone works slightly better for reducing alcohol cravings and heavy drinking, and acamprosate tends to work more poorly outside of Europe where treatment services are less robust. Difference in severity may also play a role.

=== Compliance ===
Some struggle to take the full course of medication (2 tablets, 3 times a day), which makes acamprosate less effective. Standard support to help people take their medication involves monthly check-ins with addiction services or a GP. Research found that compared to standard support alone, extra telephone support by a pharmacist, plus financial incentives, increased the number of people who took medication as prescribed and was cost-effective. The same telephone support without financial incentives did not significantly increase the number of people taking their medication as prescribed and was less cost-effective.

== Contraindications ==
Acamprosate is primarily removed by the kidneys. A dose reduction is suggested in those with moderately impaired kidneys (creatinine clearance between 30 mL/min and 50 mL/min). It is also contraindicated in those who have a strong allergic reaction to acamprosate calcium or any of its components.

== Adverse effects ==
The US label carries warnings about increases in suicidal behavior, depression, and kidney failure.

Adverse effects that caused people to stop taking the drug in clinical trials included diarrhea, nausea, depression, and anxiety.

Potential adverse effects include headache, stomach pain, back pain, muscle pain, joint pain, chest pain, infections, flu-like symptoms, chills, heart palpitations, high blood pressure, fainting, vomiting, upset stomach, constipation, increased appetite, weight gain, edema, sleepiness, decreased sex drive, impotence, forgetfulness, abnormal thinking, abnormal vision, distorted sense of taste, tremors, runny nose, coughing, difficulty breathing, sore throat, bronchitis, and rashes.

== Pharmacology ==
Acamprosate calcium

=== Pharmacodynamics ===
The pharmacodynamics of acamprosate are complex and not fully understood.

Ethanol (alcohol) acts on the central nervous system by binding to the GABA_{A} receptor, increasing the effects of the inhibitory neurotransmitter GABA (i.e., it acts as positive allosteric modulators at these receptors). In alcohol use disorder, one of the main mechanisms of tolerance is attributed to GABA_{A} receptors becoming downregulated (i.e., these receptors become less sensitive to GABA). When alcohol is no longer consumed, these down-regulated GABA_{A} receptor complexes are so insensitive to GABA that the typical amount of GABA produced has little effect, leading to physical withdrawal symptoms; since GABA normally inhibits neural firing, GABA_{A} receptor desensitization results in unopposed excitatory neurotransmission (i.e., fewer inhibitory postsynaptic potentials occur through GABA_{A} receptors), leading to neuronal over-excitation (i.e., more action potentials in the postsynaptic neuron).

In addition, alcohol also inhibits the activity of NMDA receptors (NMDARs). Chronic alcohol consumption leads to the overproduction (upregulation) of these receptors. Thereafter, sudden alcohol abstinence causes the excessive numbers of NMDARs to be more active than normal and to contribute to the symptoms of delirium tremens and excitotoxic neuronal death. Withdrawal from alcohol induces a surge in release of excitatory neurotransmitters like glutamate, which activates NMDARs. Acamprosate reduces this glutamate surge. The drug also protects cultured cells from excitotoxicity induced by alcohol withdrawal and from glutamate exposure combined with ethanol withdrawal.

Although its ability to correct an overabundance of glutamate is well-established, the actual molecular target behind this action is poorly known. Knowledge on this topic has seen several major revisions.

==== GABA/NMDA hypothesis ====
Acamprosate is originally believed to act as an NMDA receptor antagonist and positive allosteric modulator of GABA_{A} receptors.

The activity of acamprosate on those receptors is indirect, unlike that of most other agents used in this context. An inhibition of the GABA-B system is believed to cause indirect enhancement of GABA_{A} receptors. The effects on the NMDA complex are dose-dependent; the product appears to enhance receptor activation at low concentrations, while inhibiting it when consumed in higher amounts, which counters the excessive activation of NMDA receptors in the context of alcohol withdrawal.

At high concentrations, well above those that occur clinically (1 μM to 3 μM), there are reports of inhibition of glutamate receptor-activated responses (1 mM), enhancement of NMDA receptor function (300 μM), weak antagonization of the NMDA receptor, and partial agonism of the polyamine site of the NMDA receptor. However, no direct action of acamprosate at clinically relevant concentrations has yet been reported. At clinical levels, any inhibition of the NMDA receptor probably occurs in an allosteric way.

One of acamprosate's purported mechanisms of action is the enhancement of GABA signaling at GABA_{A} receptors via positive allosteric receptor modulation. It has been purported to open the chloride ion channel in a novel way as it does not require GABA as a cofactor, making it less liable for dependence than benzodiazepines. Acamprosate has been successfully used to control tinnitus, hyperacusis, ear pain, and inner ear pressure during alcohol use due to spasms of the tensor tympani muscle.

==== mGluR hypothesis ====
Two later hypothesized targets are mGluR1 and mGluR5 (10 μM). The idea originated from the fact that acamprosate blocked the neurotoxicity of an agonist of mGluR1 and mGluR5. However, a subsequent study found no action of acamprosate on the mGluR1 or mGluR5 at concentrations as high as 100 μM, nor at GABA_{A} or glycine receptors or voltage-gated sodium channels. In addition, even if the 10 μM figure is correct, it would still be clinically irrelevant.

==== Calcium hypothesis ====
Spanagel et al. (2014) show that the effects of acamprosate calcium can mostly be attributed to the calcium component. Replacing calcium with sodium produces an inactive drug. Calcium chloride has a similar effect on glutamate neurotransmission. Moreover, calcium carbonate has a similar craving-reducing effect on human alcoholics.

==== Synergy hypothesis ====
Ademar et al. (2023) report that acamprosate sodium does, in fact, enhance the effect of calcium chloride in an animal alcoholism model, and hence is not a fully inactive molecule. They also show a role of increased dopamine levels in the nucleus accumbe downstream of the glycine receptor, partly mimicking ethanol.

==== Other effects ====
The product also increases the endogenous production of taurine.

The substance also helps re-establish a standard sleep architecture by normalizing stage 3 and REM sleep phases, which is believed to be an important aspect of its pharmacological activity.

=== Pharmacokinetics ===
Acamprosate is not metabolized by the human body. Acamprosate's absolute bioavailability from oral administration is approximately 11%, and its bioavailability is decreased when taken with food. Following administration and absorption of acamprosate, it is excreted unchanged (i.e., as acamprosate) via the kidneys. Co-administration with naltrexone increases plasma levels.

Its absorption and elimination are very slow, with a t_{max} of 6 hours and an elimination half life of over 30 hours. Steady-state levels are reached by day 5 of oral treatment.

== History ==
Acamprosate was developed by Lipha, a subsidiary of Merck KGaA. and was approved for marketing in Europe in 1989.

In October 2001 Forest Laboratories acquired the rights to market the drug in the US.

It was approved by the US Food and Drug Administration (FDA) in July 2004.

The first generic versions of acamprosate were launched in the US in 2013.

As of 2015, acamprosate was in development by Confluence Pharmaceuticals as a potential treatment for fragile X syndrome. The drug was granted orphan drug designation for this use by the FDA in 2013, and by the European Medicines Agency (EMA) in 2014.

== Society and culture ==
=== Names ===
Acamprosate is the International Nonproprietary Name (INN) and the British Approved Name (BAN). Acamprosate calcium is the United States Adopted Name (USAN) and the Japanese Accepted Name (JAN). It is also technically known as N-acetylhomotaurine or as calcium acetylhomotaurinate.

It is sold under the brand name Campral.

== Research ==
In addition to its apparent ability to help people refrain from drinking, some evidence suggests that acamprosate is neuroprotective (that is, it protects neurons from damage and death caused by the effects of alcohol withdrawal, and possibly other causes of neurotoxicity).

It has been tried for autism, both idiopathic and fragile X syndrome-linked. It appears to reduce amyloid-beta precursor protein levels.
