= Vilazodone =

Antidepressant medication

- Molecular structure of vilazodone

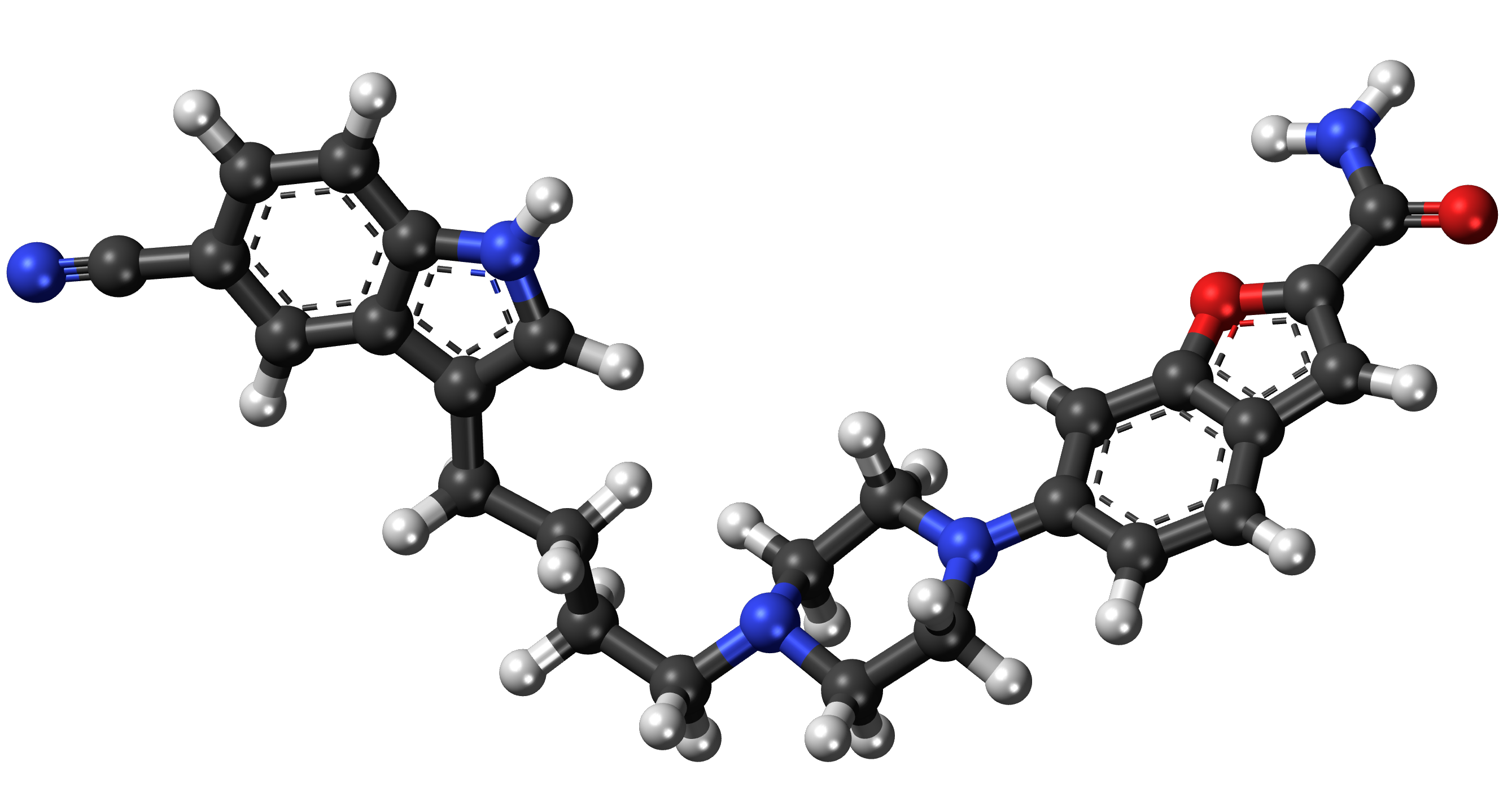
- 3D representation of a vilazodone molecule

Clinical data
- Pronunciation: /vɪˈlæzədoʊn/ vi-LAZ-ə-dohn
- Trade names: Viibryd
- Other names: EMD-68843; SB-659746A
- AHFS/Drugs.com: Monograph
- MedlinePlus: a611020
- License data: US DailyMed: Vilazodone
- Routes of administration: By mouth
- Drug class: Serotonin modulator
- ATC code: N06AX24 (WHO)

Legal status
- Legal status: BR: Class C1 (Other controlled substances); CA: ℞-only; US: ℞-only

Pharmacokinetic data
- Bioavailability: 72% (oral, with food)
- Metabolism: Liver via CYP3A4
- Elimination half-life: 25 hours
- Excretion: Faecal and renal

Identifiers
- IUPAC name: 5-(4-[4-(5-Cyano-1H-indol-3-yl)butyl]piperazin-1-yl)benzofuran-2-carboxamide
- CAS Number: 163521-12-8; as HCl: 163521-08-2
- PubChem CID: 6918314; as HCl: 6918313
- IUPHAR/BPS: 7427
- DrugBank: DB06684; as HCl: DBSALT000187
- ChemSpider: 5293518; as HCl: 5293517
- UNII: S239O2OOV3; as HCl: U8HTX2GK8J
- KEGG: D09698; as HCl: D09699
- ChEBI: CHEBI:70707; as HCl: CHEBI:70705
- ChEMBL: ChEMBL439849; as HCl: ChEMBL1615374
- PDB ligand: YG7 (PDBe, RCSB PDB)
- CompTox Dashboard (EPA): DTXSID80870086

Chemical and physical data
- Formula: C_{26}H_{27}N_{5}O_{2}
- Molar mass: 441.535 g·mol^{−1}
- 3D model (JSmol): Interactive image
- SMILES: N#Cc5ccc4[nH]cc(CCCCN3CCN(c2ccc1oc(C(N)=O)cc1c2)CC3)c4c5
- InChI: InChI=1S/C26H27N5O2/c27-16-18-4-6-23-22(13-18)19(17-29-23)3-1-2-8-30-9-11-31(12-10-30)21-5-7-24-20(14-21)15-25(33-24)26(28)32/h4-7,13-15,17,29H,1-3,8-12H2,(H2,28,32); Key:SGEGOXDYSFKCPT-UHFFFAOYSA-N

Vilazodone, sold under the brand name Viibryd among others, is a medication used to treat major depressive disorder. It is classified as a serotonin modulator and is taken by mouth.

Its common side effects include nausea, diarrhea, and trouble sleeping. Serious side effects may include increased suicidal thoughts or actions in those under the age of 25, serotonin syndrome, bleeding, activation of mania or hypomania, pancreatitis, seizures, angle-closure glaucoma, sleep paralysis, and sexual dysfunction.

Vilazodone may cause a syndrome of inappropriate antidiuretic hormone secretion (SIADH). A withdrawal syndrome may occur if the dose is rapidly decreased. Use during pregnancy and breastfeeding is not generally recommended. It is in the serotonin modulator class of medications and is believed to work both as a selective serotonin reuptake inhibitor (SSRI) and activator of the 5-HT_{1A} receptor.

Vilazodone was approved for medical use in the United States in 2011 and in Canada in 2018. In 2019, it was the 334th most commonly prescribed medication in the United States, with more than 900 thousand prescriptions. The drug lost patent protection in June 2022 for adults and in July 2023 for pediatrics. Generic versions have been approved by the US Food and Drug Administration.

== Medical uses ==
Seven controlled efficacy trials were conducted of vilazodone for treatment of major depressive disorder. Five of these trials showed no significant influence of vilazodone over placebo on depressive symptoms. In the remaining two trials, small but significant advantages of vilazodone over placebo were found. According to these two eight-week trials in adults, vilazodone has an antidepressant response after one week of treatment. After eight weeks it resulted in a 13% greater response than placebo. Remission rates, however, were not significantly different versus placebo.

According to the US Food and Drug Administration (FDA) in 2011, "it is unknown whether vilazodone has any advantages compared to other drugs in the antidepressant class." A 2019 review stated that "present studies do not suggest the superiority of vilazodone compared with other antidepressants."

Development of vilazodone for generalized anxiety disorder has been stopped as of 2017. While there is tentative evidence of a small benefit in generalized anxiety disorder, there is a high rate of side effects.

== Adverse effects ==
In September 2016, the US Food and Drug Administration (FDA) required a new warning to be added to the prescribing information related to a link between vilazodone and acute pancreatitis and sleep paralysis. In addition, other sleep disturbances such as hypnagogic hallucinations and sleep terrors can occur.

Sleep paralysis is a state, during waking up or falling asleep, in which a person is conscious but experiences full-body paralysis. During an episode, the person may hallucinate (hear, feel, or see things that are not there), which often results in fear. A night terror, also called sleep terror, is a sleep disorder causing feelings of panic or dread. The rate of sleep paralysis adverse events was high enough to merit an FDA warning added to the Viibryd prescription label.

In July 2021, the US Food and Drug Administration required a new warning to be added to the prescription label that vilazodone may cause sexual dysfunction. Per the FDA label, sexual dysfunction can include ejaculatory delay or failure, decreased libido, and erectile dysfunction in male patients. In female patients, sexual dysfunction can include decreased libido and delayed or absent orgasm.

The most common adverse effects include nausea, diarrhea, vomiting, and insomnia.

After a one-year, open-label study assessing the safety and tolerability of vilazodone in people with major depressive disorder, the most common adverse effects were diarrhea (35.7%), nausea (31.6%), and headache (20.0%); greater than 90% of these adverse effects were mild or moderate. In randomized controlled trials, meanwhile, these rates were 28%, 23.4% and 13.3%, respectively. In contrast to other selective serotonin reuptake inhibitors (SSRIs), initial trials showed that vilazodone did not cause decreased sexual desire/function, which often cause people to abandon their use. However, post-marketing experience led the FDA to warn that vilazodone may cause sexual dysfunction.

=== Pregnancy ===
Antidepressant exposure (including vilazodone) is associated with shorter average duration of pregnancy (by three days), increased risk of preterm delivery (by 55%), lower birth weight (by 75 g), and lower Apgar scores (by <0.4 points). It is uncertain whether there is an increased rate of septal heart defects among children whose mothers were prescribed an SSRI in early pregnancy.

== Pharmacology ==
=== Pharmacodynamics ===
Vilazodone acts as a serotonin reuptake inhibitor (IC_{50} = 2.1 nM; K_{i} = 0.1 nM) and 5-HT_{1A} receptor partial agonist (IC_{50} = 0.2 nM; IA = ~60–70%). It has negligible affinity for other serotonin receptors such as 5-HT_{1D}, 5-HT_{2A}, and 5-HT_{2C}, as well as the norepinephrine and dopamine transporters (K_{i} = 56 nM for NET and 37 nM for DAT). A small clinical study found occupancy of the 5-HT_{1A} receptor with vilazodone, whereas occupancy of the SERT by vilazodone in humans does not seem to have been studied. It also possesses negligible, if any, clinically relevant affinity for vesicular monoamine transporter 2 (VMAT2) inhibitor (IC_{50} = 69 nM).

=== Pharmacokinetics ===
Vilazodone is best absorbed with food and has a bioavailability of 72% under fed conditions. The C_{max} increased between 147 and 160% and the AUC increased between 64 and 85% of vilazodone when it was administered with either a fatty or light meal.

== History ==
It was developed by Merck KGaA and licensed by Clinical Data, a biotech company purchased by Forest Laboratories in 2011.
