= Pharmacology of antidepressants =

Antidepressant pharmacology hypotheses

The pharmacology of antidepressants is not entirely clear.

The earliest and probably most popular scientific theory of antidepressant action is the monoamine hypothesis (which can be traced back to the 1950s), which states that depression is due to an imbalance (most often a deficiency) of the monoamine neurotransmitters (namely serotonin, norepinephrine and dopamine). It was originally proposed based on the observation that certain hydrazine anti-tuberculosis agents produce antidepressant effects, which was later linked to their inhibitory effects on monoamine oxidase, the enzyme that catalyses the breakdown of the monoamine neurotransmitters. All antidepressants that have entered the market before 2011 had the monoamine hypothesis as their initial theoretical basis, with the possible exception of agomelatine, which acts on a dual melatonergic-serotonergic pathway.

Despite the success of the monoamine hypothesis, it has a number of limitations: for one, all monoaminergic antidepressants have a delayed onset of action of at least a week; and secondly, there are a sizeable portion (>40%) of depressed patients that do not adequately respond to monoaminergic antidepressants. Further evidence to the contrary of the monoamine hypothesis are the recent findings that a single intravenous infusion with ketamine, an antagonist of the NMDA receptor — a type of glutamate receptor — produces rapid (within 2 hours), robust and sustained (lasting for up to 2 weeks) antidepressant effects. Monoamine precursor depletion also fails to alter mood. To overcome these flaws with the monoamine hypothesis a number of alternative hypotheses have been proposed, including the glutamate, neurogenic, epigenetic, cortisol hypersecretion, and inflammatory hypotheses. Another hypothesis which could explain the delay suggests monoamines don't directly influence mood, but influence emotional perception biases.

== Monoamine hypothesis ==
In 1965, Joseph Schildkraut published a review article stating that several researchers had found an association between depression and deficiency of the catecholamine family of monoamine neurotransmitters, which they had begun calling the "catecholamine hypothesis", also known as the monoamine hypothesis.

By 1985, the monoamine hypothesis was mostly dismissed until it was revived with the introduction of selective serotonin reuptake inhibitors (SSRIs) through the successful direct-to-consumer advertising, often revolving around the claim that SSRIs correct a chemical imbalance caused by a lack of serotonin within the brain.

Serotonin levels in the human brain are measured indirectly by sampling cerebrospinal fluid for its main metabolite, 5-hydroxyindole-acetic acid, or by measuring the serotonin precursor, tryptophan. In one placebo controlled study funded by the National Institutes of Health, tryptophan depletion was achieved, but they did not observe the anticipated depressive response. Similar studies aimed at increasing serotonin levels did not relieve symptoms of depression. At this time, decreased serotonin levels in the brain and symptoms of depression have not been linked

Although there is evidence that antidepressants inhibit the reuptake of serotonin, norepinephrine, and to a lesser extent dopamine, the significance of this phenomenon in the amelioration of psychiatric symptoms is not known. Given the low overall response rates of antidepressants, and the poorly understood causes of depression, it is premature to assume a putative mechanism of action of antidepressants.

While monoamine oxidase inhibitors (MAOIs), tricyclic antidepressants (TCAs), and SSRIs increase serotonin levels, others prevent serotonin from binding to 5-HT_{2A}receptors, suggesting it is too simplistic to say serotonin is a "happy neurotransmitter". In fact, when the former antidepressants build up in the bloodstream and the serotonin level is increased, it is common for the patient to feel worse for the first weeks of treatment. One explanation is that 5-HT_{2A} receptors evolved as a saturation signal (people who use 5-HT_{2A} antagonists often gain weight), telling the animal to stop searching for food, a mate, etc., and to start looking for predators. In a threatening situation, it is beneficial for the animal not to feel hungry even if it needs to eat. Stimulation of 5-HT_{2A} receptors will achieve that. But if the threat is long lasting, the animal needs to start eating and mating again - the fact that it survived shows that the threat was not as dangerous as perceived. So the number of 5-HT_{2A} receptors decreases through a process known as downregulation and the animal goes back to its normal behavior. This suggests that there are two ways to relieve anxiety in humans with serotonergic drugs: by blocking stimulation of 5-HT_{2A} receptors or by overstimulating them until they decrease via tolerance.

== Hypothalamic-pituitary-adrenal axis ==
One manifestation of depression is an altered hypothalamic-pituitary-adrenal axis (HPA axis) that resembles the neuro-endocrine (cortisol) response to stress, that of increased cortisol production and a subsequent impaired negative feedback mechanism. It is not known whether this HPA axis dysregulation is reactive or causative for depression. A 2003 briefing suggests that the mode of action of antidepressants may be in regulating HPA axis function.

A 2011 study combines aspects of the HPA axis theory and the neurogenic theory (see below). The researchers showed that mice under unpredictable chronic mild stress (a well-known animal model of depression) have impaired hippocampal neurogenesis and greatly reduced ability of the hippocampus to regulate the HPA axis, causing anhedonia as measured by the Cookie Test. Administration of fluoxetine (an SSRI) without removing the stressor causes increased hippocampal neurogenesis, normalization of the HPA axis, and improvement of anhedonia. If X-ray irradiation is used on the hippocampus before drug treatment to prevent neurogenesis, no improvement of anhedonia occurs. However, if an irradiated mouse is given a corticotropin-releasing factor 1 antagonist – a drug that directly targets the HPA axis – anhedonia is improved. Combined with the fact that irradiation without stressing does not impair hippocampal control of the HPA axis, the authors conclude that fluoxetine works by improving hippocampal neurogenesis, which then helps restore the HPA axis, in turn leading to improvements in depression symptoms such as anhedonia.

== Neurogenic adaptations ==
The neurogenic hypothesis states that molecular and cellular mechanisms underlying the regulation of adult neurogenesis are required for remission from depression and that neurogenesis is mediated by the action of antidepressants. A broader view is that antidepressants help by increasing neuroplasticity in general.

Chronic use of SSRI antidepressant increased neurogenesis in the hippocampus of rats and mice. Other antidepressant treatments also appear associated with hippocampal neurogenesis and/or neuroplasticity: electroconvulsive therapy, which is known to be highly effective for depression, is associated with higher brain-derived neurotrophic factor (BDNF) expression in the hippocampus as well as global rewiring; lithium and valporate, two mood stabilizers occasionally used as add-on treatment, are associated with increased survival and proliferation of neurons. Ketamine (see also esketamine), a new fast-acting antidepressant, can increase the number of dendritic spines and restore aspects of functional connectivity after a single infusion.

Other animal research suggests that long term drug-induced antidepressants effects modulate the expression of genes mediated by clock genes, possibly by regulating the expression of a second set of genes (i.e. clock-controlled genes).

The delayed onset of clinical effects from antidepressants indicates involvement of adaptive changes in antidepressant effects. Rodent studies have consistently shown upregulation of the 3, 5-cyclic adenosine monophosphate (cAMP) system induced by different types of chronic but not acute antidepressant treatment, including serotonin and norepinephrine uptake inhibitors, MAOIs, TCAs, lithium, and electroconvulsions. cAMP is synthesized from adenosine 5-triphosphate (ATP) by adenylyl cyclase and metabolized by cyclic nucleotide phosphodiesterases (PDEs).

Studies on human patients have used imaging approaches to measure the changes in density and volume of specific brain areas. The grey matter volume of parts of the brain are differently increased or decreased by SSRI use. It appears possible to use brain imaging to predict which patients are likely to respond to SSRI antidepressants.

== Anti-inflammatory and immunomodulation ==
Recent studies show pro-inflammatory cytokine processes take place during clinical depression, mania and bipolar disorder, and it is possible that symptoms of these conditions are reduced by the pharmacological effect of antidepressants on the immune system.

Studies also show that the chronic secretion of stress hormones as a result of disease, including somatic infections or autoimmune syndromes, may reduce the effect of neurotransmitters or other receptors in the brain by cell-mediated pro-inflammatory pathways, thereby leading to the dysregulation of neurohormones. SSRIs, serotonin-norepinephrine reuptake inhibitors (SNRIs) and TCAs acting on serotonin, norepinephrine and dopamine receptors have been shown to be immunomodulatory and anti-inflammatory against pro-inflammatory cytokine processes, specifically on the regulation of interferon-gamma (IFN-gamma) and interleukin-10 (IL-10), as well as TNF-alpha and interleukin-6 (IL-6). Antidepressants have also been shown to suppress TH1 upregulation.

Antidepressants, specifically TCAs and SNRIs (or SSRI-NRI combinations), have also shown analgesic properties. Antidepressants are now standard of care in chronic neuropathic pain. Antidepressants also work in mouse models of both neuropathic and inflammatory pain. In addition, tramadol is an opioid with SNRI-like activity; it retains some analgesic potency when administered with the opioid antagonist naloxone, indicating a role of its non-opioid activities.

These studies warrant investigation for antidepressants for use in both psychiatric and non-psychiatric illness and that a psycho-neuroimmunological approach may be required for optimal pharmacotherapy. Future antidepressants may be made to specifically target the immune system by either blocking the actions of pro-inflammatory cytokines or increasing the production of anti-inflammatory cytokines.

== Pharmacological data ==
=== Receptor affinity ===
A variety of monoaminergic antidepressants have been compared below:

Compound	SERT	NET	DAT	H_{1}	mACh	α_{1}	α_{2}	5-HT_{1A}	5-HT_{2A}	5-HT_{2C}	D_{2}	MT_{1A}	MT_{1B}
Agomelatine	?	?	?	?	?	?	?	?	?	631	?	0.1	0.12
Amitriptyline	3.13	22.4	5380	1.1	18	24	690	450	4.3	6.15	1460	?	?
Amoxapine	58	16	4310	25	1000	50	2600	?	0.5	2	20.8	?	?
Atomoxetine	43	3.5	1270	5500	2060	3800	8800	10900	1000	940	>35000	?	?
Bupropion	9100	52600	526	6700	40000	4550	>35000	>35000	>10000	>35000	>35000	?	?
Buspirone	?	?	?	?	?	138	?	5.7	138	174	362	?	?
Butriptyline	1360	5100	3940	?	?	?	?	?	?	?	?	?	?
Citalopram	1.38	5100	28000	380	1800	1550	>10000	>10000	>10000	617	?	?	?
Clomipramine	0.14	45.9	2605	31.2	37	39	525	>10000	35.5	64.6	119.8	?	?
Desipramine	17.6	0.83	3190	110	196	100	5500	>10000	113.5	496	1561	?	?
Dosulepin	8.6	46	5310	4	26	419	12	4004	152	?	?	?	?
Doxepin	68	29.5	12100	0.24	83.3	23.5	1270	276	26	8.8	360	?	?
Duloxetine	0.8	5.9	278	2300	3000	8300	8600	5000	504	916	>10000	?	?
Escitalopram	0.8-1.1	7800	27400	2000	1240	3900	>1000	>1000	>1000	2500	>1000	?	?
Etoperidone	890	20000	52000	3100	>35000	38	570	85	36	36	2300	?	?
Femoxetine	11	760	2050	4200	184	650	1970	2285	130	1905	590	?	?
Fluoxetine	1.0	660	4176	6250	2000	5900	13900	32400	197	255	12000	?	?
Fluvoxamine	1.95	1892	>10000	>10000	240000	1288	1900	>10000	>10000	6700	>10000	?	?
Imipramine	1.4	37	8300	37	46	32	3100	>10000	119	120	726	?	?
Lofepramine	70	5.4	18000	360	67	100	2700	4600	200	?	2000	?	?
Maprotiline	5800	11.1	1000	1.7	560	91	9400	?	51	122	665	?	?
Mazindol	100	1.2	19.7	600	?	?	?	?	?	?	?	?	?
Mianserin	4000	71	9400	1.0	500	74	31.5	1495	3.21	2.59	2052	?	?
Milnacipran	94.1	111	>10000	?	?	?	?	?	?	?	?	?	?
Mirtazapine	>10000	4600	>10000	0.14	794	608	20	3330	69	39	5454	?	?
Nefazodone	400	490	360	24000	11000	48	640	80	8.6	72	910	?	?
Nisoxetine	610	5.1	382	?	5000	?	?	?	620	?	?	?	?
Nomifensine	2941	22.3	41.1	2700	>10000	1200	6744	1183	937	>10000	>10000	?	?
Nortriptyline	16.5	4.37	3100	15.1	37	55	2030	294	5	8.5	2570	?	?
Oxaprotiline	3900	4.9	4340	?	?	?	?	?	?	?	?	?	?
Paroxetine	0.08	56.7	574	22000	108	4600	>10000	>35000	>10000	19000	32000	?	?
Protriptyline	19.6	1.41	2100	60	25	130	6600	?	26	?	?	?	?
Quetiapine	>10,000	>10,000	>10,000	7	?	22	3,630	376	99	2502	245	?	?
Reboxetine	274	13.4	11500	312	6700	11900	>10000	>10000	>10000	457	>10000	?	?
Sertraline	0.21	667	25.5	24000	625	370	4100	>35000	1000	1000	10700	?	?
Trazodone	367	>10000	>10000	220	>35000	42	320	118	35.8	224	4142	?	?
Trimipramine	149	2450	3780	1.4	58	24	680	?	?	?	?	?	?
Venlafaxine	7.7	2753	8474	>35000	>35000	>35000	>35000	>35000	>35000	>10000	>35000	?	?
Vilazodone	0.1	?	?	?	?	?	?	2.3	?	?	?	?	?
Viloxazine	17300	155	>100000	?	?	?	?	?	?	?	?	?	?
Vortioxetine	1.6	113	>1000	?	?	?	?	15 (Agonist)	?	180	?	?	?
Zimelidine	152	9400	11700	?	?	?	?	?	?	?	?	?	?

The values above are expressed as equilibrium dissociation constants in nanomoles/liter. A smaller dissociation constant indicates more affinity. SERT, NET, and DAT correspond to the abilities of the compounds to inhibit the reuptake of serotonin, norepinephrine, and dopamine, respectively. The other values correspond to their affinity for various receptors.

=== Pharmacokinetics ===
Drug	Bioavailability	t_{1/2} (hr) for parent drug (active metabolite)	V_{d} (L/kg unless otherwise specified)	C_{p} (ng/mL) parent drug (active metabolite)	T_{max}	Protein binding Parent drug (active metabolite(s))	Excretion	Enzymes responsible for metabolism	Enzymes inhibited
Tricyclic antidepressant (TCAs)
Amitriptyline	30–60%	9–27 (26–30)	?	100–250	4 hr	>90% (93–95%)	Urine (18%)	CYP3A4; CYP2C19; CYP2D6	?
Amoxapine	?	8 (30)	0.9–1.2	200–500	90 mins	90%	Urine (60%), faeces (18%)	?	?
Clomipramine	50%	32 (70)	17	100–250 (230–550)	2–6 hr	97–98%	Urine (60%), faeces (32%)	CYP2D6	?
Desipramine	?	30	?	125–300	4–6 hr	?	Urine (70%)	CYP2D6	?
Doxepin	?	18 (30)	11930	150–250	2 hr	80%	Urine	CYP2D6; CYP2C19; CYP3A3; CYP3A4	?
Imipramine	High	12 (30)	18	175–300	1–2 hr	90%	Urine	CYP1A2; CYP2C19; CYP2D6	?
Lofepramine	7%	1.7–2.5 (12–24)	?	30–50 (100–150)	1 hr	99% (92%)	Urine	CYP450	?
Maprotiline	High	48	?	200–400	8–24 hr	88%	Urine (70%); faeces (30%)	?	?
Nortriptyline	?	28–31	21	50–150	7–8.5 hr	93–95%	Urine, faeces	CYP2D6	?
Protriptyline	High	80	?	100–150	24–30 hr	92%	Urine	?	?
Tianeptine	99%	2.5–3	0.5–1	?	1–2 hr	95–96%	Urine (65%)	?	?
Trimipramine	41%	23–24 (30)	17–48	100–300	2 hr	94.9%	Urine	?	?
Monoamine oxidase inhibitors (MAOIs)
Moclobemide	55–95%	2	?	?	1–2 hr	50%	Urine, faeces (<5%)	?	MAOA
Phenelzine	?	11.6	?	?	43 mins	?	Urine	MAOA	MAO
Tranylcypromine	?	1.5–3	3.09	?	1.5–2 hr	?	Urine	MAO	MAO
Selective serotonin reuptake inhibitors (SSRIs)
Citalopram	80%	35–36	12	75–150	2–4 hr	80%	Urine (15%)	CYP3A4; CYP2C19	CYP1A2 (weak)
Escitalopram	80%	27–32	20	40–80	3.5–6.5 hr	56%	Urine (8%)	CYP3A4; CYP2C19	CYP2D6 (weak)
Fluoxetine	72%	24–72 (single doses), 96–144 (repeated dosing)	12–43	100–500	6–8 hr	95%	Urine (15%)	CYP2D6	CYP2C19 (weak–moderate); CYP2D6 (strong); CYP3A4 (weak–moderate)
Fluvoxamine	53%	18	25	100–200	3–8 hr	80%	Urine (85%)	CYP2D6; CYP1A2; CYP3A4; CYP2C9	CYP1A2 (strong); CYP2C9 (moderate); CYP3A4 (weak); CYP2C19 (strong); CYP2B6 (weak)
Paroxetine	?	17	8.7	30–100	5.2–8.1 (IR); 6–10 hr (CR)	93–95%	Urine (64%), faeces (36%)	CYP2D6	CYP2D6 (strong); CYP2B6 (strong); CYP1A2 (weak); CYP2C9 (weak); CYP2C19 (weak); CYP3A4 (weak)
Sertraline	44%	23–26 (66)	?	25–50	4.5–8.4 hr	98%	Urine (12–14% unchanged), faeces (40–45%)	CYP2B6; CYP2D6	CYP2D6 (weak–moderate); CYP2C19 (weak–moderate)
Serotonin-norepinephrine reuptake inhibitors (SNRIs)
Desvenlafaxine	80%	11	3.4	?	7.5 hr	30%	Urine (69%)	CYP3A4	CYP2D6 (weak)
Duloxetine	High	11–12	3.4	?	6 hr (empty stomach), 10 hr (with food)	>90%	Urine (70%; <1% unchanged), faeces (20%)	CYP2D6; CYP1A2	CYP2D6 (moderate)
Levomilnacipran	92%	12	387–473 L	?	6–8 hr	22%	Urine (76%; 58% as unchanged drug & 18% as N-desmethyl metabolite)	CYP3A4; CYP2C8; CYP2C19; CYP2D6; CYP2J2	?
Milnacipran	85-90%	6-8 (L-isomer), 8-10 (D-isomer)	400 L	?	2–4 hr	13%	Urine (55%)	?	?
Venlafaxine	45%	5 (11)	7.5	?	2-3 hr (IR), 5.5–9 hr (XR)	27–30% (30%)	Urine (87%)	CYP2D6	CYP2D6 (weak)
Others
Agomelatine	≥80%	1–2 hr	35 L	?	1–2 hr	95%	Urine (80%)	CYP1A2; CYP2C9; CYP2C19	?
Bupropion	?	8–24 (IR; 20, 30, 37), 21±7 (XR)	20–47	75–100	2 hr (IR), 3 hr (XR)	84%	Urine (87%), faeces (10%)	CYP2B6	CYP2D6 (moderate)
Mianserin	20-30%	21–61	?	?	3 hr	95%	Faeces (14–28%), urine (4–7%)	CYP2D6	?
Mirtazapine	50%	20–40	4.5	?	2 hr	85%	Urine (75%), faeces (15%)	CYP1A2; CYP2D6; CYP3A4	?
Nefazodone	20% (decreased by food)	2–4	0.22–0.87	?	1 hr	>99%	Urine (55%), faeces (20–30%)	CYP3A4	?
Reboxetine	94%	12–13	26 L (R,R diastereomer), 63 L (S,S diastereomer)	?	2 hr	97%	Urine (78%; 10% as unchanged)	CYP3A4	?
Trazodone	?	6–10	?	800–1600	1 hr (without food), 2.5 hr (with food)	85–95%	Urine (75%), faeces (25%)	CYP2D6	?
Vilazodone	72% (with food)	25	?	?	4–5 hr	96–99%	Faeces (2% unchanged), urine (1% unchanged)	CYP3A4; CYP2C19; CYP2D6	?
Vortioxetine	?	66	2600 L	?	7–11 hr	98%	Urine (59%), faeces (26%)	CYP2D6; CYP3A4; CYP3A5; CYP2C19; CYP2C9; CYP2A6; CYP2C8; CYP2B6	?

== See also ==
- Atypical antidepressant
- STAR*D
