= Second-generation antidepressant =

Class of antidepressants

- Drug class

Class identifiers
- Use: Depressive disorders

External links
- MeSH: D018687

Legal status

The second-generation antidepressants are a class of antidepressants characterized primarily by the era of their introduction, approximately coinciding with the 1970s and 1980s, rather than by their chemical structure or by their pharmacological effect. As a consequence, there is some controversy over which treatments actually belong in this class.

The term "third generation antidepressant" is sometimes used to refer to newer antidepressants, from the 1990s and 2000s, often selective serotonin reuptake inhibitors (SSRIs) such as; fluoxetine (Prozac), paroxetine (Paxil) and sertraline (Zoloft), as well as some non-SSRI antidepressants such as mirtazapine, nefazodone, venlafaxine, duloxetine and reboxetine. However, this usage is not universal.

== Examples ==
This list is not exhaustive, and different sources vary upon which items should be considered second-generation.

- Amineptine
- Amoxapine
- Bupropion
- Iprindole
- Maprotiline
- Medifoxamine
- Mianserin
- Nomifensine
- Tianeptine
- Trazodone
- Venlafaxine
- Viloxazine
- Sertraline

== See also ==
- Atypical antidepressant – Class of antidepressant medication
- Development and discovery of SSRI drugs
- Pharmacology of antidepressants – Antidepressant pharmacology hypotheses
- Tricyclic antidepressant – Class of medications
- Tetracyclic antidepressant – Class of pharmaceutical drugs
- Serotonin–norepinephrine reuptake inhibitor – Class of antidepressant medication
- Serotonin antagonist and reuptake inhibitor – Class of drug
- Noradrenergic and specific serotonergic antidepressant – Class of antidepressants
