= C18H22N2 =

The molecular formula C_{18}H_{22}N_{2} (molar mass: 266.38 g/mol, exact mass: 266.1783 u) may refer to:

- Cyclizine
- Desipramine
- Dibenzylpiperazine (DBZP)
- Mezepine
