= Iprindole =

Atypical tricyclic antidepressant

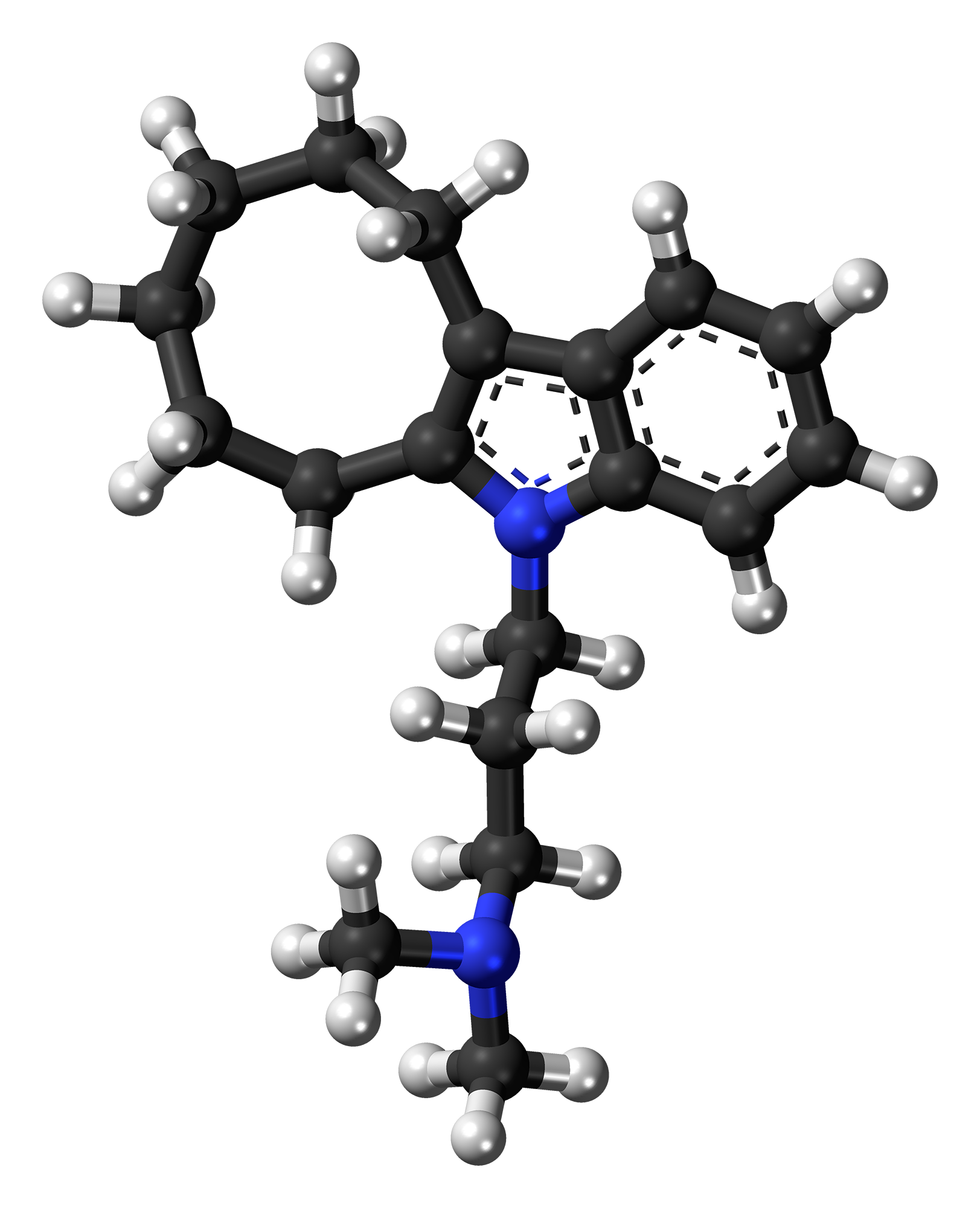

Clinical data
- Trade names: Prondol, Galatur, Tertran
- Other names: Pramindole; WY-3263
- Routes of administration: Oral
- ATC code: N06AA13 (WHO)

Legal status
- Legal status: In general: ℞ (Prescription only)

Pharmacokinetic data
- Metabolism: Hepatic
- Elimination half-life: 52.5 hours
- Excretion: Urine, Feces

Identifiers
- IUPAC name: 3-(6,7,8,9,10,11-hexahydro-5H-cycloocta[b]indol-5-yl)-N,N-dimethylpropan-1-amine
- CAS Number: 5560-72-5 20432-64-8 (hydrochloride)
- PubChem CID: 21722
- DrugBank: DB13496
- ChemSpider: 20417
- UNII: 69U0IKR8FP
- KEGG: D04605
- ChEBI: CHEBI:135177
- ChEMBL: ChEMBL126224
- CompTox Dashboard (EPA): DTXSID80204145
- ECHA InfoCard: 100.024.485

Chemical and physical data
- Formula: C_{19}H_{28}N_{2}
- Molar mass: 284.447 g·mol^{−1}
- 3D model (JSmol): Interactive image
- SMILES: c13c(n(c2ccccc12)CCCN(C)C)CCCCCC3
- InChI: InChI=1S/C19H28N2/c1-20(2)14-9-15-21-18-12-6-4-3-5-10-16(18)17-11-7-8-13-19(17)21/h7-8,11,13H,3-6,9-10,12,14-15H2,1-2H3; Key:PLIGPBGDXASWPX-UHFFFAOYSA-N

Iprindole, sold under the brand names Prondol, Galatur, and Tertran, is an atypical tricyclic antidepressant (TCA) that has been used in the United Kingdom and Ireland for the treatment of depression but appears to no longer be marketed. It was developed by Wyeth and was marketed in 1967. The drug has been described by some as the first "second-generation" antidepressant to be introduced. However, it was very little-used compared to other TCAs, with the number of prescriptions dispensed only in the thousands.

== Medical uses ==
Iprindole was used in the treatment of major depressive disorder in dosages similar to those of other TCAs.

== Contraindications ==
Iprindole has been associated with jaundice and hepatotoxicity and should not be taken by alcoholics or people with pre-existing liver disease. If such symptoms are encountered iprindole should be discontinued immediately.

== Side effects ==
Anticholinergic side effects such as dry mouth and constipation are either greatly reduced in comparison to imipramine and most other TCAs or fully lacking with iprindole. However, it still has significant antihistamine effects and therefore can produce sedation, though this is diminished relative to other TCAs similarly. Iprindole also lacks significant alpha-blocking properties, and hence does not pose a risk of orthostatic hypotension.

== Overdose ==
In overdose, iprindole is much less toxic than most other TCAs and is considered relatively benign. For instance, between 1974 and 1985, only two deaths associated with iprindole were recorded in the United Kingdom, whereas 278 were reported for imipramine, although imipramine is used far more often than iprindole.

== Interactions ==
Iprindole has been shown to be a potent inhibitor of the aromatic hydroxylation and/or N-dealkylation-mediated metabolism of many substances including, but not limited to octopamine, amphetamine, methamphetamine, fenfluramine, phenelzine, tranylcypromine, trimipramine, and fluoxetine, likely via inactivating cytochrome P450 enzymes. It also inhibits its own metabolism.

On account of these interactions, caution should be used when combining iprindole with other drugs. As an example, when administered with amphetamine or methamphetamine, iprindole increases their brain concentrations and prolongs their terminal half-lives by 2- to 3-fold, strongly augmenting both their physiological effects and neurotoxicity in the process.

== Pharmacology ==
=== Pharmacodynamics ===
Iprindole
Site	K_{i} (nM)	Species	Ref
SERT	1,620–3,300	Human	
NET	1,262	Human	
DAT	6,530	Human	
5-HT_{1A}	2,800	Human	
5-HT_{2A}	217–280	Human/rat	
5-HT_{2C}	206	Rat	
α_{1}	2,300	Human	
α_{2}	8,600	Human	
β	>10,000	Mammal	
D_{2}	6,300	Rat	
H_{1}	100–130	Human/rat	
H_{2}	200–8,300	Guinea pig	
mACh	2,100	Human	
σ_{1}	>10,000	Rat	
Values are K_{i} (nM). The smaller the value, the more strongly the drug binds to the site.

Iprindole is unique compared to most other TCAs in that it is a very weak and negligible inhibitor of the reuptake of serotonin and norepinephrine and appears to act instead as a selective albeit weak antagonist of 5-HT_{2} receptors; hence its classification by some as "second-generation". Additionally, iprindole has very weak/negligible antiadrenergic and anticholinergic activity and weak although possibly significant antihistamine activity; as such, side effects of iprindole are much less prominent relative to other TCAs, and it is well tolerated. However, iprindole may not be as effective as other TCAs, particularly in terms of anxiolysis. Based on animal research, the antidepressant effects of iprindole may be mediated through downstream dopaminergic mechanisms.

The binding affinities of iprindole for various biological targets are presented in the table to the right. It is presumed to act as an inhibitor or antagonist/inverse agonist of all sites. Considering the range of its therapeutic concentrations (e.g., 63–271 nM at 90 mg/day), only the actions of iprindole on the 5-HT_{2} and histamine receptors might be anticipated to be of possible clinical significance. However, it is unknown whether these actions are in fact responsible for the antidepressant effects of iprindole. The plasma protein binding of iprindole and hence its free percentage and potentially bioactive concentrations do not seem to be known.

=== Pharmacokinetics ===
Only one study appears to have evaluated the pharmacokinetics of iprindole. A single oral dose of 60 mg iprindole to healthy volunteers has been found to achieve mean peak plasma concentrations of 67.1 ng/mL (236 nmol/L) after 2 to 4 hours. The mean terminal half-life of iprindole was 52.5 hours, which is notably much longer than that of other TCAs like amitriptyline and imipramine. Following chronic treatment with 90 mg/day iprindole for 3 weeks, plasma concentrations of the drug ranged between 18 and 77 ng/mL (63–271 nmol/L). Theoretical steady-state concentrations should be reached by 99% within 15 to 20 days of treatment.

== Chemistry ==
Iprindole is a tricyclic compound, specifically a cyclooctaindole (that is, an indole nucleus joined with a cyclooctyl ring), and possesses three rings fused together with a side chain attached in its chemical structure. It is a tertiary amine TCA, although its ring system and pharmacological properties are very different from those of other TCAs. Other tertiary amine TCAs that are similar to iprindole include butriptyline and trimipramine. The chemical name of iprindole is 3-(6,7,8,9,10,11-hexahydro-5H-cycloocta[b]indol-5-yl)-N,N-dimethylpropan-1-amine and its free base form has a chemical formula of C_{19}H_{28}N_{2} with a molecular weight of 284.439 g/mol. The drug has been used commercially as both the free base and the hydrochloride salt. The CAS Registry Number of the free base is 5560-72-5 and of the hydrochloride is 20432–64–8.

== History ==
Iprindole was developed by Wyeth and was marketed in 1967.

== Society and culture ==
=== Generic names ===
Iprindole is the English and French generic name of the drug and its INN, USAN, BAN, and DCF, while iprindole hydrochloride is its BANM. Its generic name in Spanish and German is iprindol while its generic name in Latin is iprindolum. Iprindole was originally known unofficially as pramindole.

=== Brand names ===
Iprindole has been marketed under the brand name Prondol by Wyeth in the United Kingdom and Ireland for the indication of major depressive disorder, and has also been sold as Galatur and Tertran by Wyeth.

=== Availability ===
Iprindole was previously available in the United Kingdom and Ireland but seems to no longer be available for medical use in any country.
