= Triazoledione =

Phenylpiperazine compound

Clinical data
- Other names: BMS-180492

Pharmacokinetic data
- Elimination half-life: 18 hours

Identifiers
- IUPAC name: 1-[3-[4-(3-Chlorophenyl)piperazin-1-yl]propyl]-4-(2-phenoxyethyl)-1,2,4-triazolidine-3,5-dione
- CAS Number: 153707-88-1
- PubChem CID: 9804174
- ChemSpider: 7979934
- UNII: 3508097W2U
- ChEMBL: ChEMBL1598729
- CompTox Dashboard (EPA): DTXSID701122505

Chemical and physical data
- Formula: C_{23}H_{28}ClN_{5}O_{3}
- Molar mass: 457.96 g·mol^{−1}
- 3D model (JSmol): Interactive image
- SMILES: C1CN(CCN1CCCN2C(=O)N(C(=O)N2)CCOC3=CC=CC=C3)C4=CC(=CC=C4)Cl
- InChI: InChI=1S/C23H28ClN5O3/c24-19-6-4-7-20(18-19)27-14-12-26(13-15-27)10-5-11-29-23(31)28(22(30)25-29)16-17-32-21-8-2-1-3-9-21/h1-4,6-9,18H,5,10-17H2,(H,25,30); Key:BTNXVMLCKOPOEP-UHFFFAOYSA-N

Triazoledione (developmental code name BMS-180492) is a phenylpiperazine compound and a major metabolite of the antidepressant nefazodone. It is active, but with substantially reduced potency compared to nefazodone (approximately one-seventh). As such, it has been suggested that it is unlikely that triazoledione contributes significantly to the pharmacology of nefazodone. However, triazoledione may reach concentrations as great as 10 times those of nefazodone, and hence could still be a significant contributor to its therapeutic effects.

== Pharmacology ==
Triazoledione
Site	K_{i} (nM)	Species	Ref
SERT	≥34,527 ≥26,471	Human; Rat	
NET	>100,000; 100,000	Human; Rat	
DAT	ND	ND	ND
5-HT_{1A}	636–1,371	Rat	
5-HT_{2A}	159–211	Rat	
5-HT_{2C}	ND	ND	ND
α_{1}	173; 1,000	Human; Rat	
α_{2}	1,915; 1,000	Human; Rat	
β	>100,000	Rat	
H_{1}	11	Guinea pig	
mACh	>100,000	Rat	
Values are K_{i} (nM). The smaller the value, the more strongly the drug binds to the site.

Triazoledione shows significant affinity for the serotonin 5-HT_{1A} and 5-HT_{2A} receptors, the α_{1}-adrenergic receptor, and the histamine H_{1} receptor. It shows negligible affinity for the serotonin and norepinephrine transporters and the muscarinic acetylcholine receptors.

Comparison of binding profiles of triazoledione and related compounds
Compound	5-HT_{1A}	5-HT_{2A}	SERT	NET	α_{1}	α_{2}	β	H_{1}	mACh
Hydroxynefazodone	56–589	7.2–34	165–1,203	376–1,053	8.0–145	63–2,490	>1,000	28	11,357
mCPP	16–411	110–433	127–432	490–4,360	97–763	112–371	4,890	449	4,702
Nefazodone	52–1,030	7.1–32	181–549	200–713	5.5–144	84–41,700	>100,000	30	4,569
Trazodone	42–288	11–20	115–690	≥20,887	12–23	106–1,070	47,100	29	12,188
Triazoledione	636–1,371	159–211	≥26,471	>100,000	≥173	≥1,915	>100,000	11	>100,000
Values are K_{i} (nM). The smaller the value, the more strongly the drug binds to the site.

== See also ==
- Serotonin antagonist and reuptake inhibitor
