= Northiaden =

Chemical compound

Clinical data
- Other names: N-Desmethyldosulepin; N-Desmethyldothiepin; Nordosulepin; Nordothiepin

Identifiers
- IUPAC name: (3E)-3-(6H-Benzo[c][1]benzothiepin-11-ylidene)-N-methylpropan-1-amine
- CAS Number: 24881-71-8
- PubChem CID: 1715123
- ChemSpider: 1363695
- UNII: Z8W20XLE56
- CompTox Dashboard (EPA): DTXSID701162830

Chemical and physical data
- Formula: C_{18}H_{19}NS
- Molar mass: 281.42 g·mol^{−1}
- 3D model (JSmol): Interactive image
- SMILES: CNCC/C=C/1\C2=CC=CC=C2CSC3=CC=CC=C31
- InChI: InChI=1S/C18H19NS/c1-19-12-6-10-16-15-8-3-2-7-14(15)13-20-18-11-5-4-9-17(16)18/h2-5,7-11,19H,6,12-13H2,1H3/b16-10+; Key:FTELXJYVTOFJAI-MHWRWJLKSA-N

Northiaden, also known as N-desmethyldosulepin, is the major active metabolite of the tricyclic antidepressant (TCA) dosulepin (dothiepin; Prothiaden).
