= STAR*D =

Study on treatment of depression

- Study type: Collaborative study on the treatment of depression
- Dates: 2006
- Locations: 23 psychiatric and 18 primary care sites
- Funding: National Institute of Mental Health

Sequenced Treatment Alternatives to Relieve Depression (STAR*D) was a collaborative study on the treatment of depression, funded by the US National Institute of Mental Health. Its main focus was on the treatment of depression in patients where the first prescribed antidepressant proved inadequate. A key feature of the study was its aim to be more generalizable to real clinical situations; this was done through the use of minimal exclusion criteria, incorporating patient preference, and not blinding the treatments (i.e. the patient and clinician both knew what treatment the patient was receiving). The STAR*D trial included remission (the near-absence of symptoms, rather than simply a reduction in symptoms) as an outcome measure, as there is evidence that patients with depression who achieve remission function better and are less prone to relapse than those who achieve only partial improvement in symptoms

This report had profound impact on the promotion of antidepressants but later accused of having been subjected to multiple levels of fraud.

== Trial ==
The STAR*D trial enrolled 4,041 outpatients with nonpsychotic depression at 23 psychiatric and 18 primary care sites. The trial was completed in 2006, and data from it has been available since 2008.

The trial involved four different treatment levels, and patients were encouraged to enter the next level of treatment if they failed to achieve remission or response (50% reduction in symptoms) after a specified number of weeks.

In level one, patients received the selective serotonin reuptake inhibitor (SSRI) citalopram for up to 14 weeks, with adjustment of the dose being managed by their own physicians. If patients achieved remission or response during that time period, they could enter a 12-month naturalistic follow-up, during which time the researchers did not have any influence over the treatment plan. Non-remitters were encouraged to enter level two.

In level two, there were seven different treatment options, and cognitive behavioral therapy (CBT) was included as the psychotherapy option. There were three combination options (either an antidepressant or CBT added to citalopram), and four switch options (to either a different antidepressant or CBT). Those who remitted or responded were offered 12-month naturalistic follow-up; non-remitters after two medication trials were encouraged to enter level 3; other non-remitters entered level 2A, which involved a second antidepressant trial.

In level three, patients were offered the addition of lithium or triiodothyronine (a thyroid hormone) to their antidepressant, or a switch to another antidepressant (mirtazapine or nortriptyline). This continued for 12 weeks.

Level four consisted of the monoamine oxidase inhibitor tranylcypromine or a combination of venlafaxine and mirtazapine.

== Results ==
For level one, the remission rate was 28-33% (depending on the symptom scale used), and the response rate was 47%. Higher remission rates were seen in patients who were Caucasian, female, employed, or had higher levels of income or education. Lower remission rates were seen in those with longer depressive episodes, co-occurring anxiety or substance use disorders, and more physical illness.

For level two, patients who received CBT, either alone or combined with citalopram, had similar response and remission rates compared to those who were receiving medication(s) only; however, for those patients who remained on citalopram, those who had another antidepressant added achieved remission more rapidly than those who had CBT added. Among the patients who were switched to a different antidepressant, there was no significant difference among the different antidepressants.

For level three, the remission rates based on the HAM-D symptom scale were 12.3% for mirtazapine and 19.8% for nortriptyline, although the difference was not statistically significant. The remission rates based on the HAM-D in the combination strategy were 15.9% for lithium and 24.7% for triiodothyronine, but the difference was not statistically significant. However, more patients receiving lithium than triiodothyronine left the study due to side effects.

For level four, the average remission rate was 13%, with no statistically significant difference between tranylcypromine and the venlafaxine/mirtazapine combination. More patients receiving tranylcypromine left the study due to side effects.

Overall, the study findings indicate that patients who do not achieve remission or response after several weeks of citalopram treatment could achieve those outcomes by the end of 14 weeks. The STAR*D researchers state that their data "suggest that a patient with persistent depression can get well after trying several treatment strategies, but his or her odds of beating the depression diminish as additional treatment strategies are needed." With failed treatment at a higher step, the chances of remission were smaller – and this decrease was particularly significant after level two. For those who did achieve full remission, there was a decreased chance of relapse at 12-month (naturalistic) follow-up compared to those patients who only responded.

A reanalysis published in 2023 concluded that STAR*D's cumulative remission rate was approximately half of that reported.

== Criticism ==
Criticism of bias has been raised by certain researchers about the STAR*D trial:

- The research contract provided for the assessment of depression by the HRSD and IDS-C30 scales. Instead, depression was assessed using an ex-nihilo study scale (QIDS-SR), which was used for both medical decision-making and scientific evaluation.
- STAR*D changed the inclusion and exclusion criteria for subjects during the study, so 931 subjects were included when they met the exclusion criteria, and 370 subjects were excluded while they met the inclusion criteria. These changes resulted in an increase in the average score of the subjects: according to the inclusion and exclusion criteria provided by the original protocol, the remission rate was 38%; according to the inclusion and exclusion criteria implemented retrospectively, the remission rate is 67%.
- Only 7% of subjects in remission remained stable and stayed in the study until the end. This represents only 3% of subjects according to the original inclusion and exclusion criteria (108 out of 3,671). This has not been specified.

== See also ==
- Citalopram
- Venlafaxine
- Mirtazapine
- Pharmacology of antidepressants
