= Atypical antidepressant =

Class of antidepressant medication

An atypical antidepressant is any antidepressant medication that acts in a manner that is different from that of most other antidepressants.

Atypical antidepressants include:

- agomelatine
- bupropion
- dextromethorphan/bupropion
- esketamine
- gepirone
- iprindole
- opipramol
- tianeptine
- maprotiline
- mianserin
- mirtazapine
- Topiramate
- trazodone
- nefazodone

The agents vilazodone and vortioxetine are partly atypical.

Typical antidepressants include the SSRIs, SNRIs, TCAs, and MAOIs, which act mainly by increasing the levels of the monoamine neurotransmitters serotonin and/or norepinephrine. Among TCAs, trimipramine is an atypical agent in that it appears not to do this. In August 2020, esketamine (JNJ-54135419) was approved by the U.S. Food and Drug Administration (FDA) for the treatment of treatment-resistant depression with the added indication for the short-term treatment of suicidal thoughts.

Buprenorphine/samidorphan (ALKS-5461) is an antidepressant with a novel mechanism of action which was formerly under development and considered an atypical antidepressant. They act faster than available antidepressants.

== See also ==
- Second-generation antidepressant
- Pharmacology of antidepressants
- List of antidepressants
