= Dibudinic acid =

Names
- Preferred IUPAC name 2,6-Di-tert-butylnaphthalene-1,5-disulfonic acid
- Other names Dibudinate

Identifiers
CAS Number	14992-59-7; 14992-59-7 (sodium)
3D model (JSmol)	Interactive image
ChemSpider	8659881
PubChem CID	10484474
UNII	FRS4SO3K8D
- InChI: InChI=1S/C18H24O6S2/c1-17(2,3)13-9-7-12-11(15(13)25(19,20)21)8-10-14(18(4,5)6)16(12)26(22,23)24/h7-10H,1-6H3,(H,19,20,21)(H,22,23,24) Key: ZYOGLINWSLETEQ-UHFFFAOYSA-N
- SMILES: CC(C)(C)C1=C(C2=C(C=C1)C(=C(C=C2)C(C)(C)C)S(=O)(=O)O)S(=O)(=O)O

Properties
Chemical formula	C_{18}H_{24}O_{6}S_{2}
Molar mass	400.50 g·mol^{−1}
- Except where otherwise noted, data are given for materials in their standard state (at 25 °C [77 °F], 100 kPa). Infobox references

Dibudinic acid, or dibudinate, is an organic compound. It is found in some salts of pharmaceutical drugs like chlordiazepoxide dibudinate, desipramine dibudinate, levopropoxyphene dibudinate, and propranolol dibudinate.
