= Dosulepin =

Antidepressant

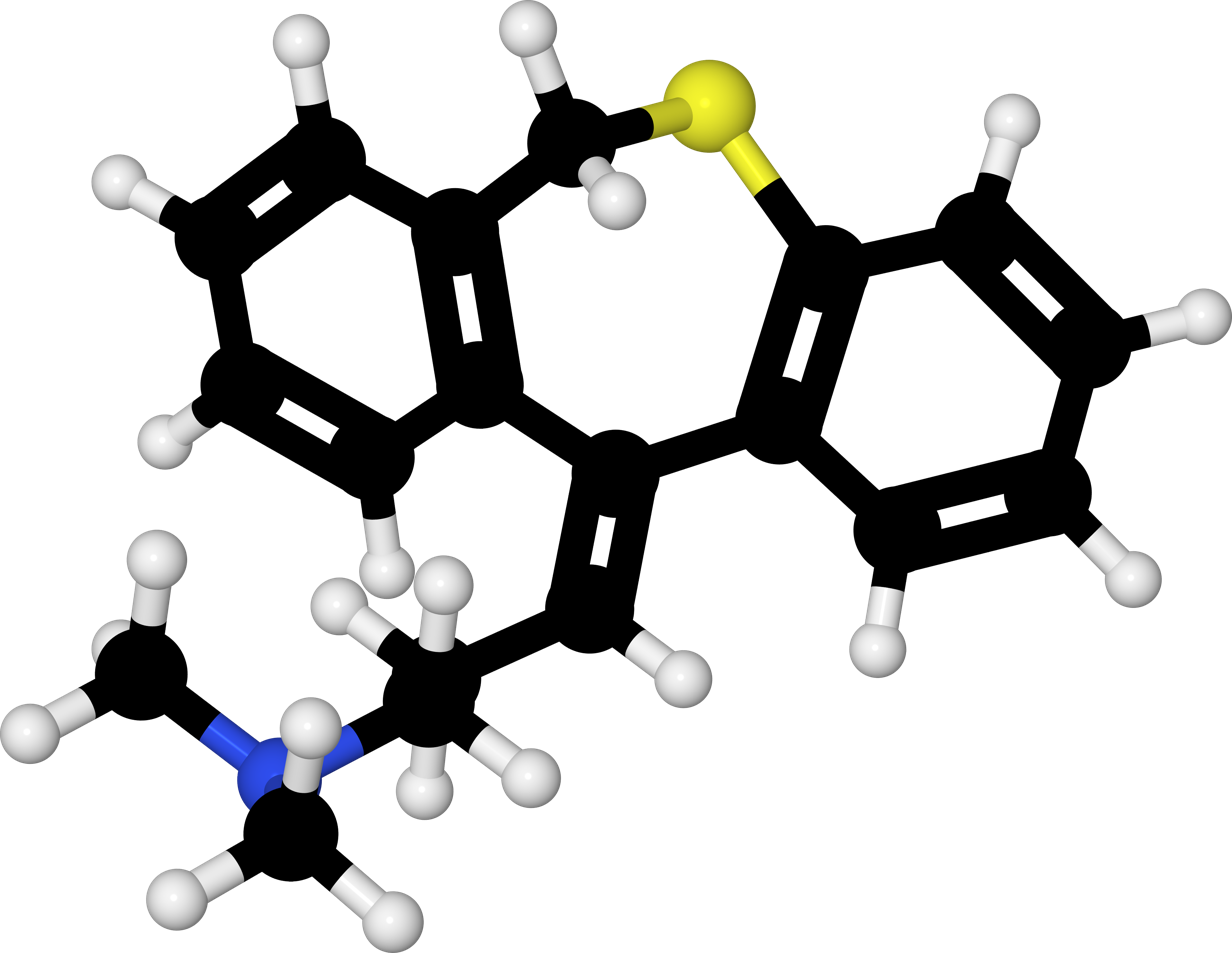

Clinical data
- Trade names: Prothiaden, others
- Other names: IZ-914, KS-1596, dothiepin (USAN US)
- AHFS/Drugs.com: International Drug Names
- Pregnancy category: AU: C
- Routes of administration: Oral
- ATC code: N06AA16 (WHO)

Legal status
- Legal status: AU: S4 (Prescription only)

Pharmacokinetic data
- Bioavailability: 30%
- Protein binding: 84%
- Metabolism: Hepatic (N-demethylation, S-oxidation, glucuronidation)
- Metabolites: Northiaden, dothiepin sulfoxide, northiaden sulfoxide, glucuronide conjugates
- Elimination half-life: Dothiepin: 14.4–23.9 hours Dothiepin sulfoxide: 22.7–25.5 hours Northiaden: 34.7–45.7 hours Northiaden sulfoxide: 24.2–33.5 hours
- Excretion: Urine: 56% Feces: 15%

Identifiers
- IUPAC name: (3E)-3-(6H-benzo[c][1]benzothiepin-11-ylidene)-N,N-dimethylpropan-1-amine
- CAS Number: 113-53-1 113-53-1; HCl: 897-15-4
- PubChem CID: 5284550
- DrugBank: DB09167
- ChemSpider: 4447605
- UNII: W13O82Z7HL; HCl: 3H0042311V
- KEGG: D07872
- ChEBI: CHEBI:36803
- ChEMBL: ChEMBL108947
- CompTox Dashboard (EPA): DTXSID2022961
- ECHA InfoCard: 100.003.665

Chemical and physical data
- Formula: C_{19}H_{21}NS
- Molar mass: 295.44 g·mol^{−1}
- 3D model (JSmol): Interactive image
- SMILES: CN(C)CC/C=C/1\C2=CC=CC=C2CSC3=CC=CC=C31
- InChI: InChI=1S/C19H21NS/c1-20(2)13-7-11-17-16-9-4-3-8-15(16)14-21-19-12-6-5-10-18(17)19/h3-6,8-12H,7,13-14H2,1-2H3/b17-11+; Key:PHTUQLWOUWZIMZ-GZTJUZNOSA-N

Dosulepin, also known as dothiepin and sold under the brand name Prothiaden among others, is a tricyclic antidepressant (TCA) which is used in the treatment of depression. Dosulepin was once the most frequently prescribed antidepressant in the United Kingdom, but it is no longer widely used due to its relatively high toxicity in overdose without therapeutic advantages over other TCAs. It acts as a serotonin–norepinephrine reuptake inhibitor (SNRI) and also has other activities including antihistamine, antiadrenergic, antiserotonergic, anticholinergic, and sodium channel-blocking effects.

== Medical uses ==
Dosulepin is used for the treatment of major depressive disorder. There is clear evidence of the efficacy of dosulepin in psychogenic facial pain, though the drug may be needed for up to a year.

== Contraindications ==
Contraindications include:

- Epilepsy as it can lower the seizure threshold
- TCAs should not be used concomitantly or within 14 days of treatment with monoamine oxidase inhibitors due to the risk for serotonin syndrome
- Acute recovery phase following myocardial infarction as TCAs may produce conduction defects and arrhythmias
- Liver failure
- Hypersensitivity to dosulepin

== Side effects ==
Common adverse effects:

- Drowsiness
- Extrapyramidal symptoms
- Tremor
- Disorientation
- Dizziness
- Paresthesias
- Alterations to ECG patterns
- Dry mouth
- Sweating
- Urinary retention
- Hypotension
- Postural hypotension
- Tachycardia
- Palpitations
- Arrhythmias
- Conduction defects
- Increased or decreased libido
- Nausea
- Vomiting
- Constipation
- Blurred vision

Less common adverse effects:

- Disturbed concentration
- Delusions
- Hallucinations
- Anxiety
- Fatigue
- Headaches
- Restlessness
- Excitement
- Insomnia
- Hypomania
- Nightmares
- Peripheral neuropathy
- Ataxia
- Incoordination
- Seizures
- Paralytic ileus
- Hypertension
- Heart block
- Myocardial infarction
- Stroke
- Gynecomastia (swelling of breast tissue in males)
- Testicular swelling
- Impotence
- Epigastric distress
- Abdominal cramps
- Parotid swellings
- Diarrhea
- Stomatitis (swelling of the mouth)
- Black tongue
- Peculiar taste sensations
- Cholestatic jaundice
- Altered liver function
- Hepatitis (swelling of the liver)
- Skin rash
- Urticaria (hives)
- Photosensitisation
- Skin blisters
- Angioneurotic edema
- Weight loss
- Urinary frequency
- Mydriasis
- Weight gain
- Hyponatremia (low blood sodium)
- Movement disorders
- Dyspepsia (indigestion)
- Increased intraocular pressure
- Changes in blood sugar levels
- Thrombocytopenia (an abnormally low number of platelets in the blood. This makes one more susceptible to bleeds)
- Eosinophilia (an abnormally high number of eosinophils in the blood)
- Agranulocytosis (a dangerously low number of white blood cells in the blood leaving one open to potentially life-threatening infections)
- Galactorrhea (lactation that is unassociated with breastfeeding and lactation)

== Overdose ==
The symptoms and the treatment of an overdose are largely the same as for the other TCAs. Dosulepin may be particularly toxic in overdose compared to other TCAs. The onset of toxic effects is around 4–6 hours after dosulepin is ingested. In order to minimise the risk of overdose it is advised that patients only receive a limited number of tablets at a time so as to limit their risk of overdosing. It is also advised that patients are not prescribed any medications that are known to increase the risk of toxicity in those receiving dosulepin due to the potential for mixed overdoses. The medication should also be kept out of reach of children.

== Interactions ==
Dosulepin can potentiate the effects of alcohol and at least one death has been attributed to this combination. TCAs potentiate the sedative effects of barbiturates, tranquilizers and CNS depressants. Guanethidine and other adrenergic neuron blocking drugs can have their antihypertensive effects blocked by dosulepin. Sympathomimetics may potentiate the sympathomimetic effects of dosulepin. Due to the anticholinergic and antihistamine effects of dosulepin anticholinergic and antihistamine medications may have their effects potentiated by dosulepin and hence these combinations are advised against. Dosulepin may have its postural hypotensive effects potentiated by diuretics. Anticonvulsants may have their efficacy reduced by dosulepin due to its ability to reduce the seizure threshold.

== Pharmacology ==
=== Pharmacodynamics ===
Dosulepin (and metabolite)
Site	DSP	NTD	Species	Ref
SERT	8.6–78	192	Human/rat	
NET	46–70	25	Human/rat	
DAT	5,310	2,539	Human/rat	
5-HT_{1A}	4,004	2,623	Rat	
5-HT_{2A}	152	141	Rat	
α_{1}	419	950	Rat	
α_{2}	2,400	ND	Human	
H_{1}	3.6–4	25	Human/rat	
mACh	25–26	110	Human/rat	
M_{1}	18	ND	Human	
M_{2}	109	ND	Human	
M_{3}	38	ND	Human	
M_{4}	61	ND	Human	
M_{5}	92	ND	Human	
Values are K_{i} (nM). The smaller the value, the more strongly the drug binds to the site.

Dosulepin is a reuptake inhibitor of the serotonin transporter (SERT) and the norepinephrine transporter (NET), thereby acting as an SNRI. It is also an antagonist of the histamine H_{1} receptor, α_{1}-adrenergic receptor, serotonin 5-HT_{2} receptors, and muscarinic acetylcholine receptors (mACh), as well as a blocker of voltage-gated sodium channels (VGSCs). The antidepressant effects of dosulepin are thought to be due to inhibition of the reuptake of norepinephrine and possibly also of serotonin.

Dosulepin has three metabolites, northiaden (desmethyldosulepin), dosulepin sulfoxide, and northiaden sulfoxide, which have longer terminal half-lives than that of dosulepin itself. However, whereas northiaden has potent activity similarly to dosulepin, the two sulfoxide metabolites have dramatically reduced activity. They have been described as essentially inactive, and are considered unlikely to contribute to either the therapeutic effects or side effects of dosulepin. Relative to dosulepin, northiaden has reduced activity as a serotonin reuptake inhibitor, antihistamine, and anticholinergic and greater potency as a norepinephrine reuptake inhibitor, similarly to other secondary amine TCAs. Unlike the sulfoxide metabolites, northiaden is thought to play an important role in the effects of dosulepin.

Although Heal & Cheetham (1992) reported relatively high K_{i} values of 12 and 15 nM for dosulepin and northiaden at the rat α_{2}-adrenergic receptor and suggested that antagonism of the receptor could be involved in the antidepressant effects of dosulepin, Richelson & Nelson (1984) found a low K_{D} of only 2,400 nM for dosulepin at this receptor using human brain tissue. This suggests that it in fact has low potency for this action, similarly to other TCAs.

=== Pharmacokinetics ===
Dosulepin is readily absorbed from the small intestine and is extensively metabolized on first-pass through the liver into its chief active metabolite, northiaden. Peak plasma concentrations of between 30.4 and 279 ng/mL (103–944 nmol/L) occur within 2–3 hours of oral administration. It is distributed in breast milk and crosses the placenta and blood–brain barrier. It is highly bound to plasma proteins (84%), and has a whole-body elimination half-life of 51 hours.

== Chemistry ==
Dosulepin is a tricyclic compound, specifically a dibenzothiepine, and possesses three rings fused together with a side chain attached in its chemical structure. It is the only TCA with a dibenzothiepine ring system to have been marketed. The drug is a tertiary amine TCA, with its side chain-demethylated metabolite northiaden (desmethyldosulepin) being a secondary amine. Other tertiary amine TCAs include amitriptyline, imipramine, clomipramine, doxepin, and trimipramine. Dosulepin exhibits (E) and (Z) stereoisomerism like doxepin but in contrast the pure E or trans isomer is used medicinally. The drug is used commercially as the hydrochloride salt; the free base is not used.

== History ==
Dosulepin was developed by SPOFA. It was patented in 1962 and first appeared in the literature in 1962. The drug was first introduced for medical use in 1969, in the United Kingdom.

== Society and culture ==
=== Generic names ===
Dosulepin is the English and German generic name of the drug and its INN and BAN, while dosulepin hydrochloride is its BANM and JAN. Dothiepin is the former BAN of the drug while dothiepin hydrochloride is the former BANM and remains the current USAN. Its generic name in Spanish and Italian and its DCIT are dosulepina, in French and its DCF are dosulépine, and in Latin is dosulepinum.

=== Brand names ===
Dosulepin is marketed throughout the world mainly under the brand name Prothiaden. It is or has been marketed under a variety of other brand names as well, including Altapin, Depresym, Dopress, Dothapax, Dothep, Idom, Prepadine, Protiaden, Protiadene, Thaden, and Xerenal.

=== Availability ===
Dosulepin is marketed throughout Europe (as Prothiaden, Protiaden, and Protiadene), Australia (as Dothep and Prothiaden), New Zealand (as Dopress) and South Africa (as Thaden). It is also available in Japan, Hong Kong, Taiwan, India, Singapore, and Malaysia. The drug is not available in the United States or Canada.
