= Mezepine =

Chemical compound

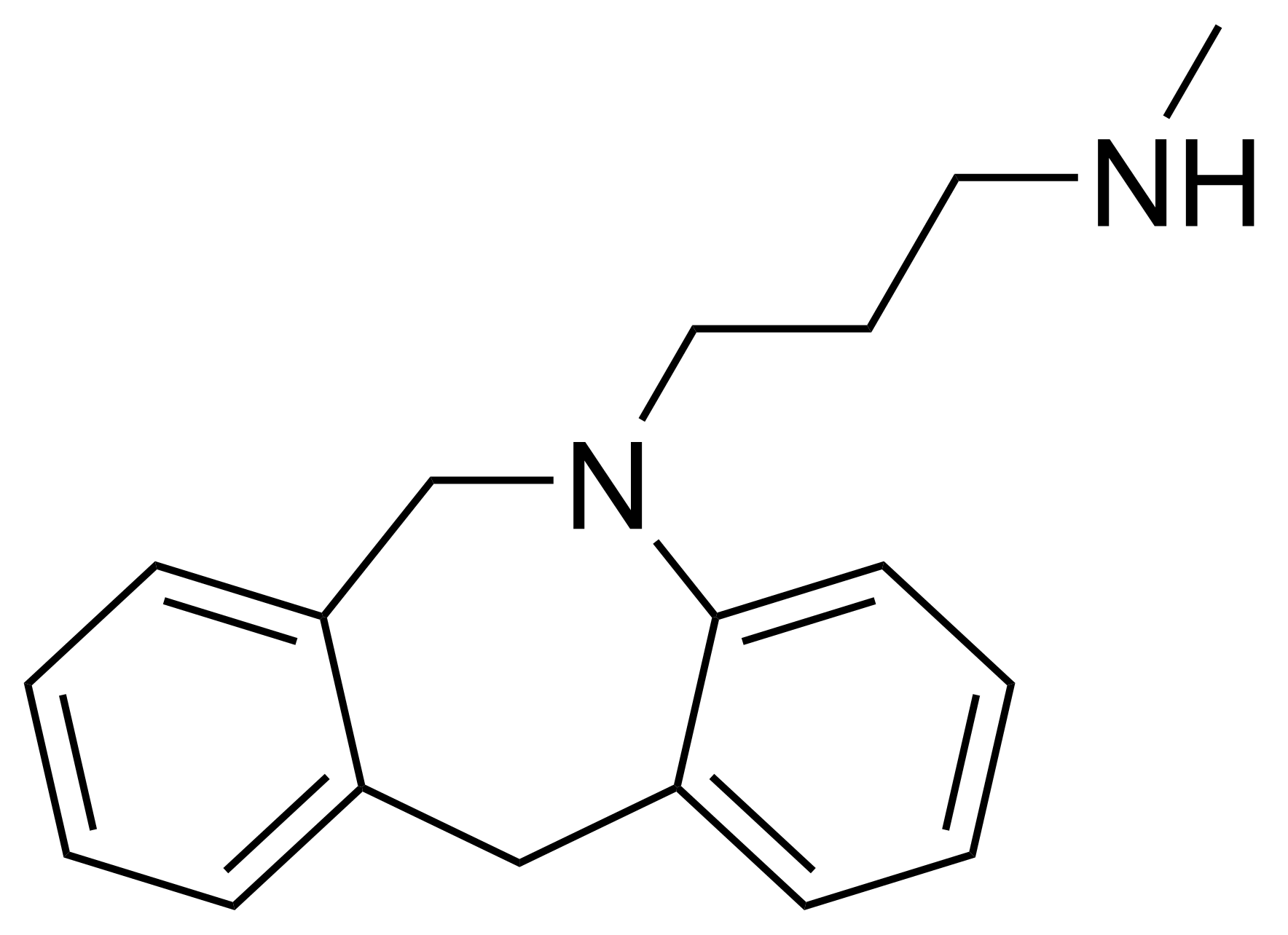

Clinical data
- ATC code: None

Identifiers
- IUPAC name: 3-(6,11-dihydro-5H-dibenzo[b,e]azepin-5-yl)-N-methylpropan-1-amine
- CAS Number: 27432-00-4 27229-23-8 (fumarate) 27470-75-3 (oxalate)
- PubChem CID: 3047746
- ChemSpider: 2310073
- UNII: P21N4Z6JHO
- CompTox Dashboard (EPA): DTXSID90181852

Chemical and physical data
- Formula: C_{18}H_{22}N_{2}
- Molar mass: 266.388 g·mol^{−1}
- 3D model (JSmol): Interactive image
- SMILES: c1cc3c(cc1)Cc2c(cccc2)CN3CCCNC

Mezepine is a tricyclic antidepressant (TCA) that was never marketed.

== See also ==
- Tricyclic antidepressant
