= Hydroxynefazodone =

Chemical compound

Clinical data
- Other names: OH-NEF

Pharmacokinetic data
- Elimination half-life: 1.5–4 hours

Identifiers
- IUPAC name: 2-[3-[4-(3-Chlorophenyl)piperazin-1-yl]propyl]-5-(1-hydroxyethyl)-4-(2-phenoxyethyl)-1,2,4-triazol-3-one
- CAS Number: 98159-82-1 98159-83-2 (dihydrochloride)
- PubChem CID: 11755137
- ChemSpider: 9929840
- UNII: 325402PVUU
- CompTox Dashboard (EPA): DTXSID60913420 DTXSID10471904, DTXSID60913420

Chemical and physical data
- Formula: C_{25}H_{32}ClN_{5}O_{3}
- Molar mass: 486.01 g·mol^{−1}
- 3D model (JSmol): Interactive image
- SMILES: CC(C1=NN(C(=O)N1CCOC2=CC=CC=C2)CCCN3CCN(CC3)C4=CC(=CC=C4)Cl)O
- InChI: InChI=1S/C25H32ClN5O3/c1-20(32)24-27-31(25(33)30(24)17-18-34-23-9-3-2-4-10-23)12-6-11-28-13-15-29(16-14-28)22-8-5-7-21(26)19-22/h2-5,7-10,19-20,32H,6,11-18H2,1H3; Key:VKGQYGXMUUBRBD-UHFFFAOYSA-N

Hydroxynefazodone is a phenylpiperazine compound and a major metabolite of the antidepressant nefazodone. It has similar biological activity and a similar elimination half-life (1.5 to 4 hours) to those of nefazodone, and may contribute significantly to its effects.

== See also ==
- Serotonin antagonist and reuptake inhibitor
