= C13H18ClNO2 =

The molecular formula C_{13}H_{18}ClNO_{2} (molar mass: 255.74 g/mol, exact mass: 255.1026 u) may refer to:

- Alaproclate
- (2R,3R)-Hydroxybupropion
- Cloforex (Oberex)
- Ethachlor
- Hydroxybupropion
- Radafaxine
