= Dextromethorphan/bupropion =

Combination medication

Combination of
- Dextromethorphan: NMDA receptor antagonist, σ_{1} receptor agonist, serotonin–norepinephrine reuptake inhibitor
- Bupropion: Norepinephrine–dopamine reuptake inhibitor, CYP2D6 inhibitor

Clinical data
- Trade names: Auvelity
- Other names: DXM/BUP; AXS-05
- License data: US DailyMed: Dextromethorphan and bupropion
- Routes of administration: By mouth
- ATC code: N06AX62 (WHO)

Legal status
- Legal status: US: ℞-only

Identifiers
- CAS Number: 2360540-77-6
- KEGG: D12493

Dextromethorphan/bupropion, sold under the brand name Auvelity, is a combination medication for the treatment of major depressive disorder (MDD) and agitation associated with dementia due to Alzheimer's disease. Its active components are dextromethorphan (DXM) and bupropion. It is taken as a tablet by mouth.

Side effects of dextromethorphan/bupropion include dizziness, headache, diarrhea, somnolence, dry mouth, sexual dysfunction, and hyperhidrosis, among others. The mechanism of action of dextromethorphan/bupropion in the treatment of depression is unknown.

Dextromethorphan/bupropion was developed by Axsome Therapeutics and was approved for the treatment of major depressive disorder in the United States in August 2022.

== Medical uses ==
=== Depression ===
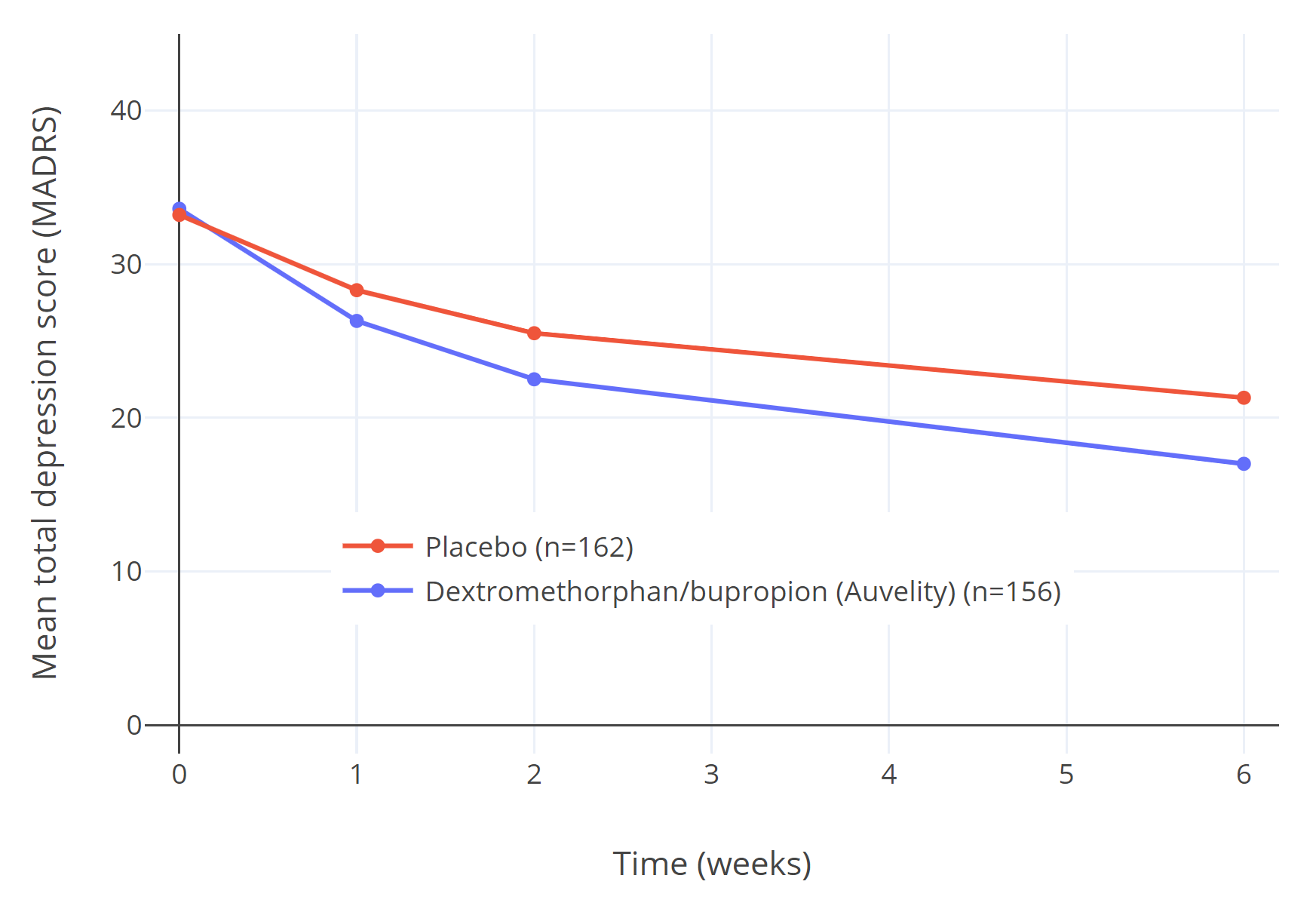
Antidepressant efficacy of dextromethorphan/bupropion (Auvelity) versus placebo in the GEMINI clinical trial. The scores shown are the mean total depression scores on the MADRS over 6 weeks. Only 124/156 patients completed 6 weeks of Auvelity while 150/162 patients completed 6 weeks of placebo, consistent with a high rate of adverse reactions.

Dextromethorphan/bupropion is approved for the treatment of major depressive disorder. Dextromethorphan and bupropion have both individually been reported to be effective for the treatment of this condition. The effect size of bupropion alone relative to placebo for depression is small, whereas only limited evidence exists for dextromethorphan alone. The combination was approved in the US on the basis of two regulatory clinical trials.

In Study 1 (GEMINI), a six-week randomized controlled trial of dextromethorphan/bupropion versus placebo in people with major depressive disorder, scores on the Montgomery–Åsberg Depression Rating Scale (MADRS)—a scale with a range of 0 to 60 points—decreased with dextromethorphan/bupropion by 15.9 points from a baseline score of 33.6 points (an approximate 47% reduction) and decreased with placebo by 12.1 points from a baseline score of 33.2 points (an approximate 36% reduction). This resulted in a least-squares mean difference in reduction of depression scores between dextromethorphan/bupropion and placebo of 3.9 points, with the placebo group showing approximately 76% of the improvement in depression scores as the dextromethorphan/bupropion group and with depression scores at baseline improving overall about 11% more with the medication than with placebo. In antidepressant trials of six to eight weeks duration recorded in the Food and Drug Administration (FDA) database, the average difference from placebo with other antidepressants was 2.5 points. The mean improvement in scores with dextromethorphan/bupropion was statistically significant but not clinically significant relative to placebo at all assessed timepoints including at the end of week 1, although at the end of the study some patients did have clinically significant improvement.

In Study 2 (STRIDE-1), dextromethorphan/bupropion was compared with bupropion alone in another randomized controlled trial. The dose of bupropion in the study was lower than the target dose recommended for clinical practice. In this study, dextromethorphan/bupropion showed significantly greater improvement than bupropion alone in the first two weeks of treatment but not by week 6 of treatment in people with major depressive disorder. The baseline scores were 33.4 points with dextromethorphan/placebo and 33.2 points with placebo, while the score reductions at week 1 were 5.2 points on the MADRS with dextromethorphan/bupropion and 3.6 points with bupropion (a 1.6-point difference), at week 2 were 8.0 points with dextromethorphan/bupropion and 6.1 points with bupropion (a 1.9-point difference), and at week 6 were 11.6 points with dextromethorphan/bupropion and 9.4 points with bupropion (a 2.2-point difference). On the basis of this trial, the FDA concluded that dextromethorphan contributes to the apparent antidepressant effects of dextromethorphan/bupropion.

== Side effects ==
Side effects of dextromethorphan/bupropion include dizziness, nausea, headache, diarrhea, somnolence, dry mouth, sexual dysfunction (including abnormal orgasm, erectile dysfunction, decreased libido, and anorgasmia), hyperhidrosis, anxiety, constipation, decreased appetite, insomnia, arthralgia, fatigue, paresthesia, and blurred vision. These side effects occurred at rates ≥2% and to a greater extent than with placebo in clinical trials.

== Contraindications ==
Dextromethorphan/bupropion is contraindicated for people with any of the following conditions:

- Seizure disorders. Dextromethorphan/bupropion may decrease the seizure threshold.
- Bulimia or anorexia. These disorders can lower the seizure threshold, and it may make food avoidance worse.
- Abrupt discontinuation of a CNS depressant like alcohol, benzodiazepines, or barbiturates. Discontinuation of these severely lowers the seizure threshold and significantly increase the risk of having a seizure.
- Hypertension. Dextromethorphan/bupropion may worsen hypertension, especially when dextromethorphan/bupropion is combined with other drugs that also worsen hypertension.

== Interactions ==
Bupropion may lower the seizure threshold. Therefore, caution is advised when combining dextromethorphan/bupropion with other medications that also lower the seizure threshold, such as alcohol, tramadol, clozapine, and CNS stimulants like amphetamine, cocaine, and methylphenidate.

Dextromethorphan (a component of the combination) increases serotonin; this can lead to a life threatening complication known as serotonin syndrome (especially when serotonergic drugs are combined). Therefore, caution should be used when combining dextromethorphan with other drugs that increase serotonin. Certain drugs that increase serotonin include CNS stimulants like amphetamine and cocaine, selective serotonin reuptake inhibitors, and triptans.

Bupropion (a component of the combination) may increase blood pressure and lead to hypertension. Therefore, combining dextromethorphan/bupropion with other drugs that increase blood pressure may result in hypertension. Some examples of drugs that increase blood pressure are stimulants like cocaine, amphetamine, caffeine, methylphenidate, and pseudoephedrine, monoamine oxidase inhibitors, and certain NSAIDs like ibuprofen.

Because bupropion is a CYP2D6 inhibitor, the medication can increase the plasma concentrations of drugs metabolized by this enzyme. Examples of such drugs are risperidone, aripiprazole, codeine, metoprolol, and tamoxifen.

== Pharmacology ==
=== Pharmacodynamics ===
Dextromethorphan acts as an NMDA receptor antagonist, σ_{1} receptor agonist, and serotonin–norepinephrine reuptake inhibitor, among other actions, while bupropion acts as a norepinephrine–dopamine reuptake inhibitor and nicotinic acetylcholine receptor negative allosteric modulator. Bupropion is also a potent inhibitor of CYP2D6, and thereby inhibits the metabolism of dextromethorphan. Dextromethorphan/bupropion has less activity as an NMDA receptor antagonist than dextromethorphan alone. This is because bupropion is a potent CYP2D6 inhibitor and prevents the bioactivation of dextromethorphan into dextrorphan, a much more potent NMDA receptor antagonist and weaker serotonin reuptake inhibitor than dextromethorphan itself. The mechanism of action of dextromethorphan/bupropion in the treatment of depression is unknown, although the preceding pharmacological actions are assumed to be involved.

Dextromethorphan and metabolite
Site	DXM	DXO	Species
NMDAR (MK-801)	2120–8945	486–906	Rat
σ_{1}	142–652	118–481	Rat
σ_{2}	11060–22864	11325–15582	Rat
MOR	1280; ND	420; 1000+	Rat; Human
DOR	11500	34700	Rat
KOR	7000	5950	Rat
SERT	23–40	401–484	Rat
NET	240+	340+	Rat
DAT	1000+	1000+	Rat
5-HT_{1A}	1000+	1000+	Rat
5-HT_{1B}_{/}_{1D}	61% at 1 μM	54% at 1 μM	Rat
5-HT_{2A}	1000+	1000+	Rat
α_{1}	1000+	1000+	Rat
α_{2}	60% at 1 μM	1000+	Rat
β	1000+	35% at 1 μM	Rat
D_{2}	1000+	1000+	Rat
H_{1}	1000+	95% at 1 μM	Rat
mAChRs	1000+	100% at 1 μM	Rat
nAChRs	700–8900 (IC_{50})	1300–29600 (IC_{50})	Rat
VDSCs	50000+ (IC_{50})	ND	Rat
Values are K_{i} (nM), unless otherwise noted. The smaller the value, the more strongly the drug binds to the site.

Because dextromethorphan (DXM) acts predominantly as the parent compound rather than through dextrorphan in this combination, the contribution of the active metabolite can largely be disregarded when analyzing the combination's pharmacological effects. Dextrorphan primarily provides NMDA channel blockade. However, DXM itself exhibits its strongest activity as a serotonin transporter (SERT) inhibitor and σ1 receptor agonist, while its NMDA antagonism is actually quite weak. The conversion of DXM to dextrorphan by the CYP2D6 enzyme is substantially inhibited by bupropion, resulting in extremely high plasma concentrations of the parent DXM. Consequently, NMDA receptor antagonism through dextrorphan is clinically quite limited, whereas σ1 receptor agonism and SERT inhibition become the dominant pharmacological actions. Based on pharmacokinetic data, it can be inferred that DXM in this medication may achieve approximately 60–85% whole-brain SERT occupancy, a level comparable to that of most SSRIs (selective serotonin reuptake inhibitors). In addition, σ1 receptor agonism, which was previously investigated as a target for antidepressant development, likely contributes to the therapeutic efficacy.

Bupropion produces relatively strong inhibition of the norepinephrine transporter (NET) and achieves approximately 14–28% dopamine transporter (DAT) occupancy, making it an NDRI (norepinephrine-dopamine reuptake inhibitor). Bupropion also antagonizes nicotinic acetylcholine receptors, acts as a weak positive allosteric modulator of the σ1 receptor, and inhibits 5-HT3 receptors. The significance of these additional actions for antidepressant effects remains unclear. The combined pharmacological actions of DXM and bupropion make the combination function similarly to an SNDRI (serotonin-norepinephrine-dopamine reuptake inhibitor), simultaneously enhancing all three monoamine neurotransmitter systems. This characteristic may contribute to its relatively rapid antidepressant onset.

The role of NMDA antagonism in dextromethorphan/bupropion appears to be relatively limited. Ketamine and related compounds do indeed owe their rapid antidepressant effects to NMDA receptor antagonism. However, subsequent studies of numerous NMDA antagonists have found that most do not exhibit antidepressant efficacy. The reason appears to be that antidepressant activity requires exceptionally stringent molecular properties for NMDA receptor antagonism, particularly highly specific receptor-binding kinetics. In practice, neither DXM nor dextrorphan fulfills these requirements. This likely explains why dextromethorphan/bupropion requires approximately 8 days to produce antidepressant effects, whereas esketamine can begin working within only a few hours. Therefore, although dextromethorphan/bupropion substantially shortens the onset of action compared with conventional oral antidepressants, its mechanism underlying the accelerated antidepressant response appears to have only a limited relationship to the rapid antidepressant mechanism of ketamine.

=== Pharmacokinetics ===
When administered together as dextromethorphan/bupropion, the elimination half-life of dextromethorphan is 22 hours and the elimination half-life of bupropion is 15 hours. The elimination half-lives of bupropion active metabolites are 35 hours for hydroxybupropion, 44 hours for erythrohydrobupropion, and 33 hours for threohydrobupropion. Bupropion inhibits the metabolism of dextromethorphan by inhibiting the enzyme CYP2D6, the major enzyme responsible for the metabolism of dextromethorphan. This in turn improves the bioavailability of dextromethorphan, prolongs its half-life, prevents its metabolism into dextrorphan, and increases the ratio of dextromethorphan to dextrorphan in the body.

== History ==
Dextromethorphan/bupropion was developed by Axsome Therapeutics. It was approved for the treatment of major depressive disorder by the US Food and Drug Administration in August 2022.

== Society and culture ==
=== Brand names ===
Dextromethorphan/bupropion is sold under the brand name Auvelity.

=== Legal status ===
Dextromethorphan/bupropion is not a controlled substance in the United States. The misuse potential of dextromethorphan and bupropion has not been systematically studied. However, both dextromethorphan and bupropion may have misuse liability at supratherapeutic doses. Despite the known misuse potential of dextromethorphan, it is available widely as an over-the-counter drug. Conversely, bupropion is a prescription-only medication.

== Research ==
Dextromethorphan/bupropion is under development for the treatment of smoking withdrawal. As of September 2026, it is in phase III trials for this indication.
