= (2R,3R)-Hydroxybupropion =

Major metabolite of the antidepressant bupropion

Clinical data
- Other names: (R,R)-Hydroxybupropion

Pharmacokinetic data
- Metabolism: Glucuronidation
- Metabolites: Hydroxybupropion glucuronide
- Elimination half-life: 19–26 hours

Identifiers
- IUPAC name: (2R,3R)-2-(3-chlorophenyl)-3,5,5-trimethylmorpholin-2-ol
- CAS Number: 192374-15-5
- PubChem CID: 9943908
- ChemSpider: 8119520
- ChEMBL: ChEMBL1172929
- CompTox Dashboard (EPA): DTXSID40433176

Chemical and physical data
- Formula: C_{13}H_{18}ClNO_{2}
- Molar mass: 255.74 g·mol^{−1}
- 3D model (JSmol): Interactive image
- SMILES: C[C@@H]1[C@](OCC(N1)(C)C)(C2=CC(=CC=C2)Cl)O
- InChI: InChI=1S/C13H18ClNO2/c1-9-13(16,17-8-12(2,3)15-9)10-5-4-6-11(14)7-10/h4-7,9,15-16H,8H2,1-3H3/t9-,13+/m1/s1; Key:RCOBKSKAZMVBHT-RNCFNFMXSA-N

(2R,3R)-Hydroxybupropion, or simply (R,R)-hydroxybupropion, is the major metabolite of the antidepressant, smoking cessation, and appetite suppressant medication bupropion. It is the (2R,3R)-enantiomer of hydroxybupropion, which in humans occurs as a mixture of (2R,3R)-hydroxybupropion and (2S,3S)-hydroxybupropion (radafaxine). Hydroxybupropion is formed from bupropion mainly by the cytochrome P450 enzyme CYP2B6. Levels of (2R,3R)-hydroxybupropion are dramatically higher than those of bupropion and its other metabolites during bupropion therapy.

== Exposure with bupropion ==
Bupropion is substantially converted into metabolites during first-pass metabolism with oral administration and levels of its metabolites are much higher than those of bupropion itself. Exposure to (2R,3R)-hydroxybupropion is 29-fold higher than to (R)-bupropion and exposure to (2S,3S)-hydroxybupropion is 3.7-fold higher than to (S)-bupropion. Other metabolites that circulate at higher concentrations than those of bupropion include threohydrobupropion and to a lesser extent erythrohydrobupropion.

The metabolism of bupropion and its metabolites is stereoselective. During bupropion therapy, exposure to (R)-bupropion is 2- to 6-fold higher than to (S)-bupropion and exposure to (2R,3R)-hydroxybupropion is 20- to 65-fold higher than to (2S,3S)-hydroxybupropion. Hence, (2R,3R)-hydroxybupropion is a major metabolite of bupropion and (2S,3S)-hydroxybupropion is a minor metabolite.

In contrast to humans, only low levels of hydroxybupropion or (2R,3R)-hydroxybupropion occur with bupropion in rats. This highlights substantial species differences in the pharmacokinetics of bupropion between animals and humans. These differences in turn may account for differences in the pharmacodynamic effects of bupropion between species.

== Pharmacology ==
=== Pharmacodynamics ===
(2R,3R)-Hydroxybupropion is much less pharmacologically active as a monoamine reuptake inhibitor than bupropion or (2S,3S)-hydroxybupropion. Conversely, its potency as a negative allosteric modulator of nicotinic acetylcholine receptors is variable but overall more similar to that of bupropion and (2S,3S)-hydroxybupropion.

Bupropion and hydroxybupropion functional activities (IC_{50}) at human biological targets
Compound	Monoamine reuptake inhibition			nAChR inhibition				Ref
Compound	DA	NE	5-HT	α_{3}β_{4}	α_{4}β_{2}	α_{4}β_{4}	α_{1}β_{1}	Ref
Bupropion	660–2,900	1,450–1,850	>10,000–47,000	1,800	12,000	12,000–14,000	7,900	
(2R,3R)-Hydroxybupropion	>10,000	9,900	>10,000	6,500	31,000	41,000	7,600	
(2S,3S)-Hydroxybupropion	630	241	>10,000	10,000–11,000	3,300	30,000	28,000	
Notes: Values are in nanomolar (nM) units. The smaller the value, the more avidly the compound affects the site.

Bupropion and hydroxybupropion inhibition (IC_{50}, nM) of rat monoamine transporters
Compound	DAT	NET
Bupropion	550 ± 65	1900 ± 12
(2RS,3RS)-Hydroxybupropion	>10000	1700 ± 830
(2S,3S)-Hydroxybupropion	790 ± 11	520 ± 35
(2R,3R)-Hydroxybupropion	>10000	>10000
Notes: Values are in nanomolar (nM) units. The smaller the value, the more avidly the compound affects the site.

Additional studies have characterized the affinities (K_{i}) of bupropion and the hydroxybupropion enantiomers at the monoamine transporters as well as affinities and potencies (IC_{50}) using non-human proteins. In contrast to bupropion and (2S,3S)-hydroxybupropion, racemic hydroxybupropion, using rat proteins, has been found to act as a selective norepinephrine reuptake inhibitor (IC_{50} = 1,700 nM) with no apparent inhibition of dopamine reuptake (IC_{50} > 10,000 nM). Normally, activity with racemic mixtures is expected to be closer to that of the active enantiomer than to the inactive enantiomer. The reasons for the discrepancy in the case of racemic hydroxybupropion are unclear. In any case, it was suggested that (2R,3R)-hydroxybupropion might be acting as a negative allosteric modulator of the binding of (2S,3S)-hydroxybupropion to the dopamine transporter.

Bupropion and (2S,3S)-hydroxybupropion are substantially more potent than (2R,3R)-hydroxybupropion in various rodent behavioral tests, such as the forced swim test (an assay of antidepressant-like activity). However, sufficient doses of bupropion, (2S,3S)-hydroxybupropion, and (2R,3R)-hydroxybupropion all produce full methamphetamine-like effects in monkeys (1 mg/kg, 3 mg/kg, and 10 mg/kg, respectively). Bupropion produces nicotine-like effects in rodents and (2S,3S)-hydroxybupropion partially substitutes for nicotine. In contrast, (2R,3R)-hydroxybupropion does not substitute for nicotine and dose-dependently antagonizes the effects of nicotine by up to 50%.

(2R,3R)-Hydroxybupropion is a strong CYP2D6 inhibitor similarly to bupropion. (2R,3R)-Hydroxybupropion alone has been estimated to account for approximately 65% of the total in vivo CYP2D6 inhibition of bupropion, whereas threohydrobupropion accounted for 21% and erythrohydrobupropion accounted for 9% (with 5% remaining or unaccounted for).

=== Pharmacokinetics ===
Hydroxybupropion, including both (2R,3R)-hydroxybupropion and (2S,3S)-hydroxybupropion, is mainly formed from bupropion by the cytochrome P450 enzyme CYP2B6. However, CYP2C19, CYP3A4, CYP1A2, and CYP2E1 appear to play a minor role.

CYP2B6 is highly polymorphic and is subject to high interindividual variability of approximately 100-fold. This may result in large interindividual differences in the metabolism of bupropion into hydroxybupropion and the effects of bupropion. However, clearance of bupropion is not affected in different CYP2B6 metabolizer phenotypes. This suggests that other enzymes compensate in the metabolism of bupropion in the context of reduced CYP2B6 function. The moderate CYP2B6 inducer rifampicin increased the clearance of (2R,3R)-hydroxybupropion and decreased its exposure and half-life by approximately 50%.

The elimination half-life of (2R,3R)-hydroxybupropion is 19 to 26 hours.

== Chemistry ==
Hydroxybupropion has two chiral centers. As a result, there are four possible enantiomers of the compound. However, only (2R,3R)-hydroxybupropion and (2S,3S)-hydroxybupropion are formed in humans. (2R,3S)- and (2S,3R)-Hydroxybupropion do not occur in humans presumably due to steric hindrance precluding their formation.
