= C13H20ClNO =

The molecular formula C_{13}H_{20}ClNO (molar mass: 241.76 g/mol) may refer to:

- Erythrohydrobupropion
- Threohydrobupropion
