= Bupropion =

Medication mainly used for depression and smoking cessation

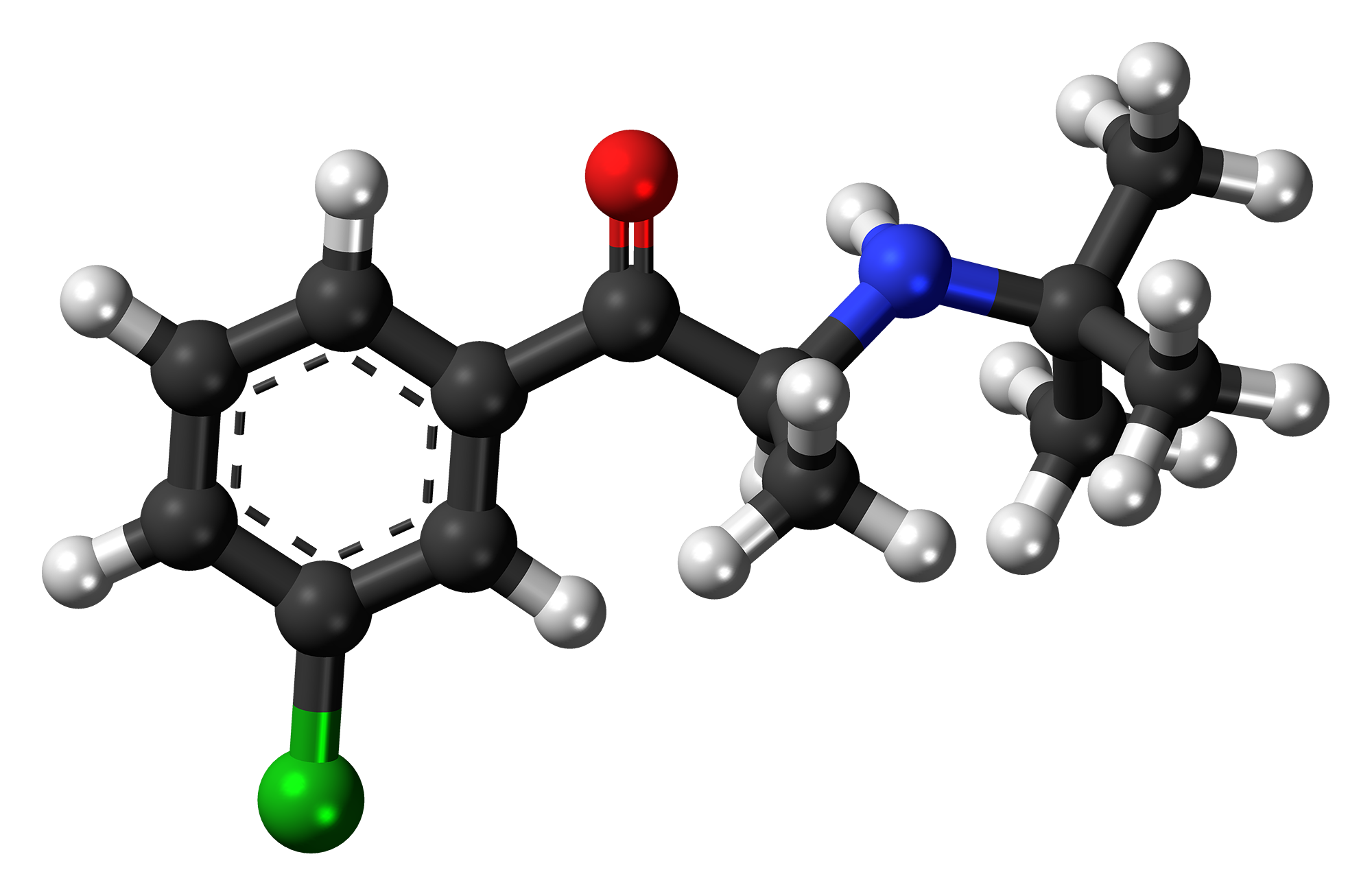

Clinical data
- Pronunciation: Bupropion: /bjuːˈproʊpiɒn/ bew-PROH-pee-on; Amfebutamone: /ˌæmfəˈbjutəmoʊn/ am-fa-BEW-teh-moan
- Trade names: Wellbutrin, others
- Other names: Amfebutamone; 3-Chloro-N-tert-butyl-β-keto-α-methylphenethylamine; 3-Chloro-N-tert-butyl-β-ketoamphetamine; 3-Chloro-N-tert-butylcathinone
- AHFS/Drugs.com: Monograph
- MedlinePlus: a695033
- License data: US DailyMed: Bupropion
- Pregnancy category: AU: B2
- Addiction liability: Low
- Routes of administration: Oral
- Drug class: Norepinephrine–dopamine reuptake inhibitor (NDRI); Nicotinic acetylcholine receptor negative allosteric modulator; Antidepressant; Stimulant
- ATC code: N06AX12 (WHO)

Legal status
- Legal status: AU: S4 (Prescription only); BR: Class C1 (Other controlled substances); CA: ℞-only; UK: POM (Prescription only); US: ℞-only; EU: Rx-only; SE: Rx-only; In general: Prescription only

Pharmacokinetic data
- Bioavailability: Unknown
- Protein binding: Bupropion: 84%; Hydroxybupropion: 77%; Threohydrobupropion: 42%
- Metabolism: Liver, intestines (CYP2B6, others)
- Metabolites: Hydroxybupropion; Threohydrobupropion; Erythrohydrobupropion; Others
- Elimination half-life: Bupropion: alpha: 0.5–1.04; beta: 11 h; Hydroxybupropion: 20 h; Threohydrobupropion: 37 h; Erythrohydrobupropion: 33 h
- Excretion: Urine: 87% (0.5% unchanged); Feces: 10%

Identifiers
- IUPAC name: (RS)-2-(tert-Butylamino)-1-(3-chlorophenyl)propan-1-one
- CAS Number: 34911-55-2 905818-69-1; as HCl: 31677-93-7
- PubChem CID: 444
- IUPHAR/BPS: 7135
- DrugBank: DB01156
- ChemSpider: 431
- UNII: 01ZG3TPX31
- KEGG: D07591; as HCl: D00817
- ChEBI: CHEBI:3219
- ChEMBL: ChEMBL894
- CompTox Dashboard (EPA): DTXSID7022706

Chemical and physical data
- Formula: C_{13}H_{18}ClNO
- Molar mass: 239.74 g·mol^{−1}
- 3D model (JSmol): Interactive image
- Chirality: Racemic mixture
- SMILES: O=C(C(C)NC(C)(C)C)C1=CC=CC(Cl)=C1
- InChI: InChI=1S/C13H18ClNO/c1-9(15-13(2,3)4)12(16)10-6-5-7-11(14)8-10/h5-9,15H,1-4H3; Key:SNPPWIUOZRMYNY-UHFFFAOYSA-N

Bupropion, formerly called amfebutamone, and sold under the brand name Wellbutrin among others, is an atypical antidepressant that is indicated in the treatment of major depressive disorder and seasonal affective disorder and to support smoking cessation. It is a norepinephrine–dopamine reuptake inhibitor (NDRI). Some evidence-based guidelines support first-line use in depression. It is also popular as an add-on medication in the cases of "incomplete response" to the first-line selective serotonin reuptake inhibitor (SSRI) antidepressant. Bupropion has several features that distinguish it from other antidepressants: it does not usually cause sexual dysfunction, it is not associated with weight gain or sleepiness, and it is more effective than SSRIs at improving symptoms of hypersomnia and fatigue. Bupropion, particularly the immediate-release formulation, carries a higher risk of seizure than many other antidepressants; hence, caution is recommended in patients with a history of seizure disorder. The medication is taken by mouth.

Common adverse effects of bupropion with the greatest difference from placebo are dry mouth, nausea, constipation, insomnia, anxiety, tremor, and excessive sweating. Raised blood pressure is notable. Rare but serious side effects include seizures, liver toxicity, psychosis, and risk of overdose. Bupropion use during pregnancy may be associated with increased likelihood of congenital heart defects.

Bupropion acts as a norepinephrine–dopamine reuptake inhibitor (NDRI) and a nicotinic receptor antagonist. However, its effects on dopamine are weak and clinical significance is contentious. Chemically, bupropion is an aminoketone that belongs to the class of cathinones and more generally that of amphetamines and phenethylamines.

Bupropion was invented by Nariman Mehta, who worked at Burroughs Wellcome, in 1969. It was first approved for medical use in the United States in 1985. Bupropion was originally called by the generic name amfebutamone, before being renamed in 2000. In 2024, it was the seventeenth most commonly prescribed medication in the United States, with more than 34 million prescriptions. It is on the World Health Organization's List of Essential Medicines. In 2022, the US Food and Drug Administration (FDA) approved the combination dextromethorphan/bupropion to serve as a rapid-acting antidepressant in patients with major depressive disorder.

== Medical uses ==
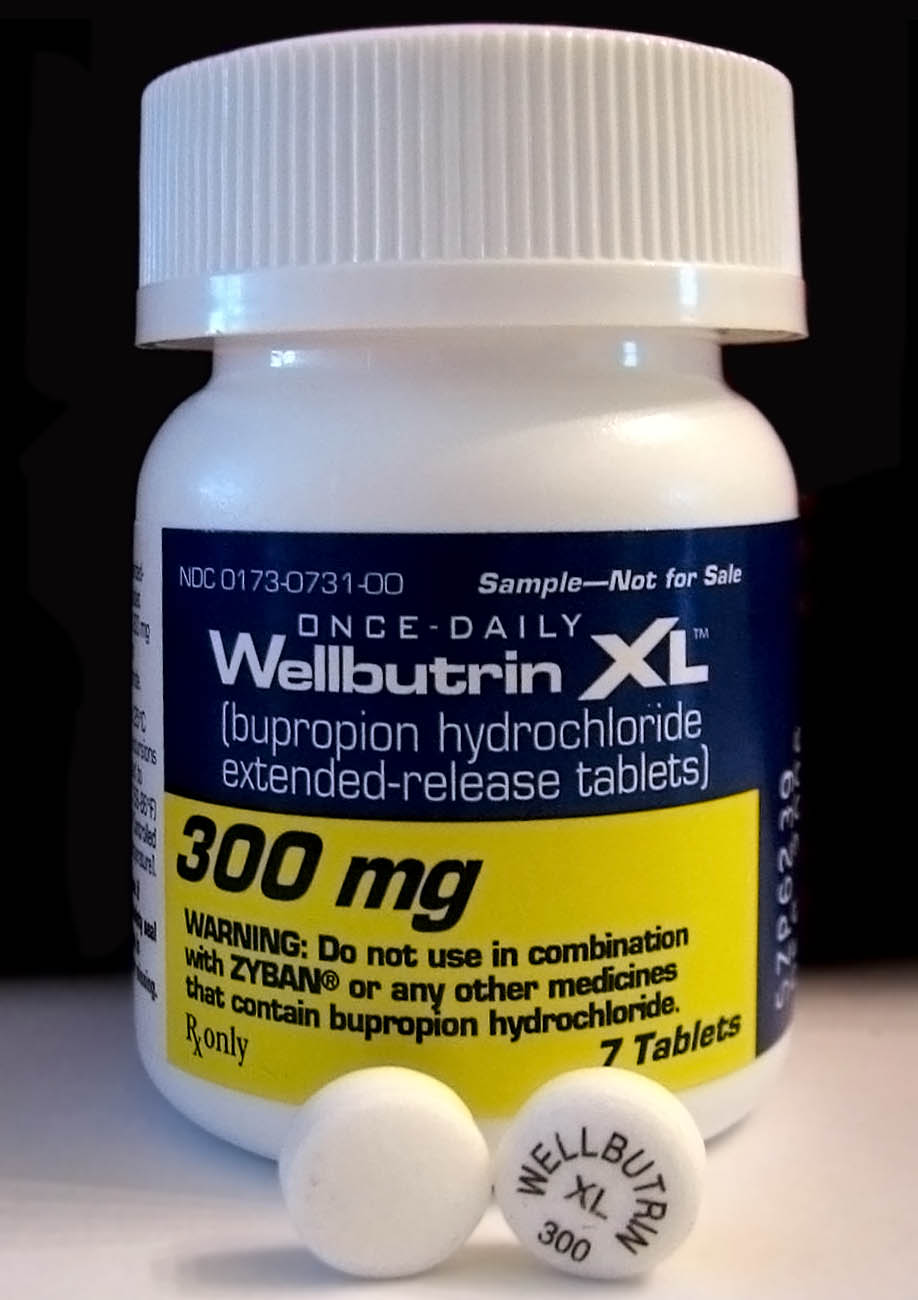
A bottle of brand-name Wellbutrin XL 300 mg tablets.

=== Depression ===
The evidence overall supports the effectiveness of bupropion over placebo for the treatment of depression. Evidence-based guidelines consistently recommend bupropion as a treatment option for adults with major depressive disorder; some support first-line use for major depressive disorder, but there is limited guidance for treatment-resistant depression. Some peer-reviewed studies suggest the quality of evidence is low. Some meta-analyses report that bupropion has an at-most small effect size for depression. Evidence suggests that the effectiveness of bupropion for depression is similar to that of other antidepressants.

Over the autumn and winter months, bupropion can prevent the development of depression in those who have recurring seasonal affective disorder: 15% of participants on bupropion experienced a major depressive episode vs. 27% of those on placebo. Bupropion also improves depression in bipolar disorder, however the risk of an affective switch is similar to other antidepressants.

Bupropion has several features that distinguish it from other antidepressants: for instance, unlike the majority of antidepressants, it does not usually cause sexual dysfunction, and the occurrence of sexual side effects is not different from placebo. Bupropion treatment is not associated with weight gain; on the contrary, the majority of studies observed significant weight loss in bupropion-treated participants. Bupropion treatment also is not associated with the sleepiness that may be produced by other antidepressants. Bupropion is more effective than selective serotonin reuptake inhibitors (SSRIs) at improving symptoms of hypersomnia and fatigue in depressed patients.

Bupropion is effective in the treatment of depression with comorbid anxiety (also known as anxious depression) and, contrary to common belief, does not exacerbate anxiety in this context. The effectiveness of bupropion for anxious depression is equivalent to that of SSRIs in the case of depression with low or moderate anxiety, whereas SSRIs show a modest effectiveness advantage in terms of response rates for depression with high anxiety. In contrast to other antidepressants like SSRIs, bupropion is not approved for treatment of anxiety disorders.

The addition of bupropion to a prescribed SSRI is a common strategy when people do not respond to the SSRI, and it is supported by clinical trials. However, it appears to be inferior in response rate to the addition of atypical antipsychotic aripiprazole.

=== Smoking cessation ===
Prescribed as an aid for smoking cessation, bupropion reduces the severity of craving for nicotine and withdrawal symptoms such as depressed mood, irritability, difficulty concentrating, and increased appetite. Initially, bupropion slows the weight gain that often occurs in the first weeks after quitting smoking. With time, however, this effect becomes negligible.

The bupropion treatment course lasts for seven to twelve weeks, with the patient halting the use of tobacco about ten days into the course. After the course, the effectiveness of bupropion for maintaining abstinence from smoking declines over time, from 37% of tobacco abstinence at three months to 20% at one year. It is unclear whether extending bupropion treatment helps to prevent relapse of smoking.

Overall, six months after the therapy, bupropion increases the likelihood of quitting smoking approximately 1.6-fold as compared to placebo. In this respect, bupropion is as effective as nicotine replacement therapy but inferior to varenicline. Combining bupropion and nicotine replacement therapy does not improve the quitting rate.

In children and adolescents, the use of bupropion for smoking cessation does not appear to offer any significant benefits. The evidence for its use to aid smoking cessation in pregnant women is insufficient.

=== Attention deficit hyperactivity disorder ===
In the United States, the treatment of attention deficit hyperactivity disorder (ADHD) is not an approved indication of bupropion, and it is not mentioned in the 2019 guideline on ADHD treatment from the American Academy of Pediatrics. Systematic reviews of bupropion for the treatment of ADHD in both adults and children note that bupropion may be effective for ADHD but warn that this conclusion has to be interpreted with caution, because clinical trials were of low quality due to small sizes and risk of bias. Similarly to atomoxetine, bupropion has a delayed onset of action for ADHD, and several weeks of treatment are required for therapeutic effects. This is in contrast to stimulants, such as amphetamine and methylphenidate, which have an immediate onset of effect in the condition.

=== Sexual dysfunction ===
Bupropion is less likely than other antidepressants to cause sexual dysfunction. A range of studies indicate that bupropion not only produces fewer sexual side effects than other antidepressants but can actually help to alleviate sexual dysfunction including sexual dysfunction induced by SSRI antidepressants. There have also been small studies suggesting that bupropion or a bupropion/trazodone combination may improve some measures of sexual function in women who have hypoactive sexual desire disorder (HSDD) and are not depressed.

According to an expert consensus recommendation from the International Society for the Study of Women's Sexual Health, bupropion can be considered as an off-label treatment for HSDD despite limited safety and efficacy data. Likewise, a 2022 systematic review and meta-analysis of bupropion for sexual desire disorder in women reported that although data were limited, bupropion appeared to be dose-dependently effective for the condition.

=== Weight loss ===
Bupropion, when used for treating long-term weight gain over six to twelve months, results in an average weight loss of 2.7 kilograms (6.0 lb) compared to a placebo. This is not much different from the weight loss produced by several other weight-loss medications, such as sibutramine and orlistat. The combination drug naltrexone/bupropion has been approved by the US Food and Drug Administration (FDA) for the treatment of obesity.

=== Other uses ===
Bupropion is not effective in the treatment of cocaine dependence, but it is showing promise in reducing drug use in treating amphetamine-type stimulant use and cravings.

Based on studies indicating that bupropion lowers the level of the pro-inflammatory cytokine tumor necrosis factor alpha (TNF-α), there have been suggestions that it might be useful in treating inflammatory bowel disease, psoriasis, and other autoimmune conditions, but very little clinical evidence is available.

Bupropion is not proven to be effective in treating chronic low back pain.

The drug may be useful in the treatment of excessive daytime sleepiness (EDS) and narcolepsy.

Bupropion has been used to treat disorders of diminished motivation, like apathy, abulia, and akinetic mutism. Accordingly, the drug has been found to increase effort expenditure and improve motivational deficits in animal models. However, only limited benefits of bupropion in the treatment of apathy have been observed in clinical trials in various conditions.

Bupropion has been used in the treatment of orthostatic hypotension and postural orthostatic tachycardia syndrome (POTS).

=== Available forms ===
Bupropion is available as an oral tablet in several different formulations. It is mainly formulated as the hydrochloride salt but also as the hydrobromide salt. In addition to single-drug formulations, bupropion is formulated in combinations including naltrexone/bupropion (Contrave) for obesity and dextromethorphan/bupropion (Auvelity) for depression.

== Contraindications ==
The US Food and Drug Administration (FDA) prescription label advises that bupropion should not be prescribed to individuals with epilepsy or other conditions that lower the seizure threshold, such as anorexia nervosa, bulimia nervosa, or withdrawal from benzodiazepines or alcohol. It should be avoided in individuals who are taking monoamine oxidase inhibitors (MAOIs). The label recommends that caution should be exercised when treating people with liver damage, severe kidney disease, and severe hypertension, and in children, adolescents, and young adults due to the increased risk of suicidal ideation.

== Side effects ==
The common adverse effects of bupropion with the greatest difference from placebo are dry mouth, nausea, constipation, insomnia, anxiety, tremor, and excessive sweating. Bupropion has the highest incidence of insomnia of all second-generation antidepressants, apart from desvenlafaxine. It is also associated with about 20% increased risk of headache.

Bupropion raises blood pressure in some people. One study showed an average rise of 6 mm Hg in systolic blood pressure in 10% of patients. The prescribing information notes that hypertension, sometimes severe, is observed in some people taking bupropion, both with and without pre-existing hypertension. The safety of bupropion in people with cardiovascular conditions and its general cardiovascular safety profile remains unclear due to the lack of data. Bupropion has not been associated with QT prolongation at therapeutic doses but has been associated with QT prolongation in overdose.

Seizure is a rare but serious adverse effect of bupropion. It is strongly dose-dependent: for the immediate release preparation, the seizure incidence is 0.4% at 300 to 450 mg per day; the incidence climbs almost 10-fold for the higher-than-recommended dose of 600 mg. For comparison, the incidence of unprovoked seizure in the general population is 0.07 to 0.09%, and the risk of seizure for a variety of other antidepressants is generally 0 to 0.5% at the recommended doses.

Rare cases of liver toxicity leading to death or liver transplantation have been reported for bupropion. It is considered to be one of several antidepressants with a greater risk of hepatotoxicity. The prescribing information warns about bupropion triggering an angle-closure glaucoma attack. On the other hand, bupropion may decrease the risk of development of open angle glaucoma. Bupropion has rarely been associated with instances of Stevens–Johnson syndrome.

Bupropion use by mothers in the first trimester of pregnancy is associated with a 23% increase in the odds of congenital heart defects in their children.

=== Psychiatric ===
The US Food and Drug Administration (FDA) requires all antidepressants, including bupropion, to carry a boxed warning stating that antidepressants may increase the risk of suicide in people younger than 25. This warning is based on a statistical analysis conducted by the FDA, which found a two-fold increase in suicidal thought and behavior in children and adolescents, and a 1.5-fold increase in the 18–24 age group. For this analysis, the FDA combined the results of 295 trials of 11 antidepressants to obtain statistically significant results. Considered in isolation, bupropion was not statistically different from placebo. However, a large-scale data analysis of the FAERS database (FDA Adverse Event Reporting System) found that suicidality was a frequently reported side effect. Other previously unknown potential side effects included absence of the vestibulo-ocular reflex and abnormal drug test results.

Bupropion prescribed for smoking cessation results in a 25% increase in the risk of psychiatric side effects, in particular, anxiety (about 40% increase) and insomnia (about 80% increase). The evidence is insufficient to determine whether bupropion is associated with suicides or suicidal behavior.

In rare cases, bupropion-induced psychosis may develop. It is associated with higher doses of bupropion; many cases described are at higher than recommended doses. Concurrent antipsychotic medication appears to be protective. In most cases, the psychotic symptoms are eliminated by reducing the dose, ceasing treatment, or adding antipsychotic medication.

Although studies are lacking, a handful of case reports suggest that abrupt discontinuation of bupropion may cause antidepressant discontinuation syndrome.

Rarely, bupropion has been associated with induction of compulsive behavior.

== Overdose ==
Bupropion is considered moderately dangerous in overdose. According to an analysis of US National Poison Data System, adjusted for the number of prescriptions, bupropion and venlafaxine are the two new-generation antidepressants (i.e., non-tricyclic antidepressants) that result in the highest mortality and morbidity. For significant overdoses, seizures have been reported in about a third of all cases; other serious effects include hallucinations, loss of consciousness, and abnormal heart rhythms. When bupropion was one of several kinds of pills taken in an overdose, fever, muscle rigidity, muscle damage, hypertension or hypotension, stupor, coma, and respiratory failure have been reported. While recovery was seen in most cases, death has been reported, due to multiple uncontrolled seizures and myocardial infarction.

== Interactions ==
Since bupropion is metabolized to hydroxybupropion by the enzyme CYP2B6, drug interactions with CYP2B6 inhibitors are possible: This includes such medications as paroxetine, sertraline, norfluoxetine (active metabolite of fluoxetine), diazepam, clopidogrel, and orphenadrine. The expected result is an increase in bupropion and a decrease in hydroxybupropion blood concentration. The reverse effect (decrease of bupropion and increase of hydroxybupropion) can be expected with CYP2B6 inducers such as carbamazepine, clotrimazole, rifampicin, ritonavir, St John's wort, and phenobarbital. Indeed, carbamazepine decreases exposure to bupropion by 90% and increases exposure to hydroxybupropion by 94%. Ritonavir, lopinavir/ritonavir, and efavirenz have been shown to decrease levels of bupropion and/or its metabolites. Ticlopidine and clopidogrel, both potent CYP2B6 inhibitors, have been found to considerably increase bupropion levels as well as decrease levels of its metabolite hydroxybupropion.

Bupropion and its metabolites are inhibitors of CYP2D6, with hydroxybupropion responsible for most of the inhibition. Additionally, bupropion and its metabolites may decrease the expression of CYP2D6 in the liver. The end effect is a significant slowing of the clearance of other drugs metabolized by this enzyme. For instance, bupropion has been found to increase area-under-the-curve of desipramine, a CYP2D6 substrate, five-fold. Bupropion has also been found to increase levels of atomoxetine 5.1-fold, while decreasing the exposure to its main metabolite 1.5-fold. As another example, the ratio of dextromethorphan (a drug that is mainly metabolized by CYP2D6) to its major metabolite dextrorphan increased approximately 35-fold when it was administered to people being treated with 300 mg/day bupropion. When people on bupropion are given MDMA, about 30% increase of exposure to both drugs is observed, with enhanced mood but decreased heart rate effects of MDMA. Interactions with other CYP2D6 substrates, such as metoprolol, imipramine, nortriptyline, venlafaxine, and nebivolol have also been reported. However, in a notable exception, bupropion does not seem to affect the concentrations of CYP2D6 substrates fluoxetine and paroxetine. Bupropion prevents norepinephrine and dopamine release induced by methamphetamine and has been found to reduce the subjective and sympathomimetic effects of methamphetamine in humans.

Bupropion lowers the seizure threshold, and therefore can potentially interact with other medications that also lower it, such as antipsychotics, tricyclic antidepressants, theophylline, and systemic corticosteroids. The prescribing information recommends minimizing the use of alcohol, since in rare cases bupropion reduces alcohol tolerance.

Caution should be observed when combining bupropion with a monoamine oxidase inhibitor (MAOI), as it may result in hypertensive crisis.

== Pharmacology ==
=== Pharmacodynamics ===
Bupropion binding and activity
Site	Value (nM)	Type	Species
DAT	173–1,800; 372–2,780; 330–2,900; 550–2,170	K_{i} K_{i} IC_{50} IC_{50}	Human; Rat; Human; Rat
NET	3,640–52,000; 940–1,900; 443–3,240; 1,400–1,900	K_{i} K_{i} IC_{50} IC_{50}	Human; Rat; Human; Rat
SERT	9,100–>100,000; 1,000–>10,000; 47,000–>100,000; 15,600	K_{i} K_{i} IC_{50} IC_{50}	Human; Rat; Human; Rat
α_{1/1A}-AdR	4,200–16,000	K_{i}	Human
α_{2/2A}-AdR	>10,000–81,000	K_{i}	Human
H_{1}	6,600–>10,000	K_{i}	Human
σ_{1}	580–2,100	IC_{50}	Rodent
α_{1}-nACh	7,600–28,000	IC_{50}	Human
α_{3}β_{2}-nACh	1,000	IC_{50}	Human
α_{3}β_{4}-nACh	1,800	IC_{50}	Human
α_{4}β_{2}-nACh	12,000	IC_{50}	Human
α_{4}β_{4}-nACh	12,000–14,000	IC_{50}	Human
α_{7}-nACh	7,900–50,000	IC_{50}	Human
α/β/δ/γ-nACh	7,900	IC_{50}	Human
hERG	34,000–69,000	IC_{50}	Human
Notes: (1) Values are in nanomolar (nM) units. The smaller the value, the more avidly the drug binds to or affects the site. (2) Affinities (K_{i}) were >10,000 nM at a variety of other sites (5-HT_{1}, 5-HT_{2}, β-adrenergic, D_{1}, D_{2}, mACh, nACh, GABA_{A}). More:

The mechanism of action of bupropion in the treatment of depression and for other indications is unclear. However, it is thought to be related to the fact that bupropion is a norepinephrine–dopamine reuptake inhibitor (NDRI) and negative allosteric modulator of several nicotinic acetylcholine receptors. Bupropion does not act as a norepinephrine–dopamine releasing agent. Pharmacological actions of bupropion, to a substantial degree, are due to its active metabolites hydroxybupropion, threo-hydrobupropion, and erythro-hydrobupropion that are present in the blood plasma at comparable or much higher levels. In fact, bupropion could accurately be conceptualized as a prodrug of these metabolites. The overall action of these metabolites, particularly that of one enantiomer, S,S-hydroxybupropion, is also characterized by inhibition of norepinephrine and dopamine reuptake and nicotinic inhibition (see the chart on the right). Bupropion has no meaningful direct activity at a variety of receptors, including α- and β-adrenergic, dopamine, serotonin, histamine, and muscarinic acetylcholine receptors.

The occupancy of dopamine transporter (DAT) by bupropion (300 mg/day) and its metabolites in the human brain as measured by several positron emission tomography (PET) studies is approximately 20%, with a mean occupancy range of about 14 to 26%. For comparison, the NDRI methylphenidate at therapeutic doses is thought to occupy greater than 50% of DAT sites. In accordance with its low DAT occupancy, no measurable dopamine release in the human brain was detected with bupropion (one 150 mg dose) in a PET study. In another study, striatal binding ratios of the DAT ligand [^{123}I]I-FP-CIT were reduced 7–11% with venlafaxine, 5–14% with bupropion, 15–25% with modafinil, and 16–33% with methylphenidate on single-photon emission computed tomography (SPECT) imaging in people with Parkinson's disease. These findings raise questions about the role of dopamine reuptake inhibition in the pharmacology of bupropion, and suggest that other actions may be responsible for its therapeutic effects.

No data are available on occupancy of the norepinephrine transporter (NET) by bupropion and its metabolites. However, due to the increased exposure of hydroxybupropion over bupropion itself, which has higher affinity for the NET than the DAT, bupropion's overall pharmacological profile in humans may end up making it effectively more of a norepinephrine reuptake inhibitor (NRI) than a dopamine reuptake inhibitor. A pharmacometric analysis estimated that hydroxybupropion would achieve 68% NET occupancy and bupropion itself only 2% NET occupancy, described as moderate but significant overall. Accordingly, the clinical effects of bupropion are more consistent with noradrenergic activity than with dopaminergic actions. However, in contrast to other NRIs like atomoxetine and reboxetine, but similarly to methylphenidate, bupropion fails to alter the clinical tyramine pressor response, an index of norepinephrine reuptake inhibition.

Bupropion has a particularly odd pattern of inducing DAT inhibition, since it displays markedly enhanced binding affinity towards the DAT-(NET S1) mutant (DAT with NET primary binding site) over normal (wild-type) DAT, and noticeably diminished binding affinity towards the NET-(DAT S1) mutant (NET with DAT primary binding site) over regular (wild-type) NET. In spite of clear preference for NET binding site by itself, bupropion retains overall preference for complete DAT, implying that bupropion may make use of non-binding sites on the DAT molecule to exert its own binding, as well as the potential of augmented affinity for NET if its binding site is otherwise conformationally exposed.

Bupropion has been claimed to be a sigma σ_{1} receptor agonist. Its antidepressant-like effects in rodents depend on σ_{1} receptor activation. They are enhanced and inhibited by σ_{1} receptor agonists and antagonists, respectively. However, no data on the binding or functional effects of bupropion at the human sigma receptors appear to be available. In any case, bupropion has been reported to bind to rodent σ_{1} receptors with IC_{50} values of 580 to 2,100 nM. In contrast to many other phenethylamines and amphetamines, bupropion is not an agonist of the trace amine-associated receptor 1 (TAAR1).

Bupropion has been found to have a mixture of anti-inflammatory and pro-inflammatory activity through modulation of the immune system. One such mechanism underlying these effects may be reduced levels of the pro-inflammatory cytokine tumor necrosis factor alpha (TNFα). The catecholaminergic actions of bupropion may be involved in its immunomodulatory effects. The effects of bupropion on the gut microbiota in rodents have also been studied, with increased beneficial bacteria and reduced harmful bacteria observed.

Pharmacology of bupropion and its metabolites
	Bupropion	R,R- Hydroxy bupropion	S,S- Hydroxy bupropion	Threo- hydro bupropion	Erythro- hydro bupropion
Exposure and half-life
AUC relative to bupropion	1	23.8	0.6	11.2	2.5
Half-life	10.8 h	19 h	15 h	31 h	22 h
Inhibition IC_{50} (μM) in human cells, unless noted otherwise (Lesser values indicate greater potency.)
DAT, uptake	0.66	inactive	0.63	47 (rat)	no data
NET, uptake	1.85	9.9	0.24	16 (rat)	no data
SERT, uptake	inactive	inactive	inactive	67 (rat)	no data
α_{3}β_{4} nicotinic	1.8	6.5	11	14 (rat)	no data
α_{4}β_{2} nicotinic	12	31	3.3	no data	no data
α_{1}β_{1}γδ nicotinic	7.9	7.6	28	no data	no data
5-HT_{3A}	87 (mouse)	113	no data	no data	no data

=== Pharmacokinetics ===
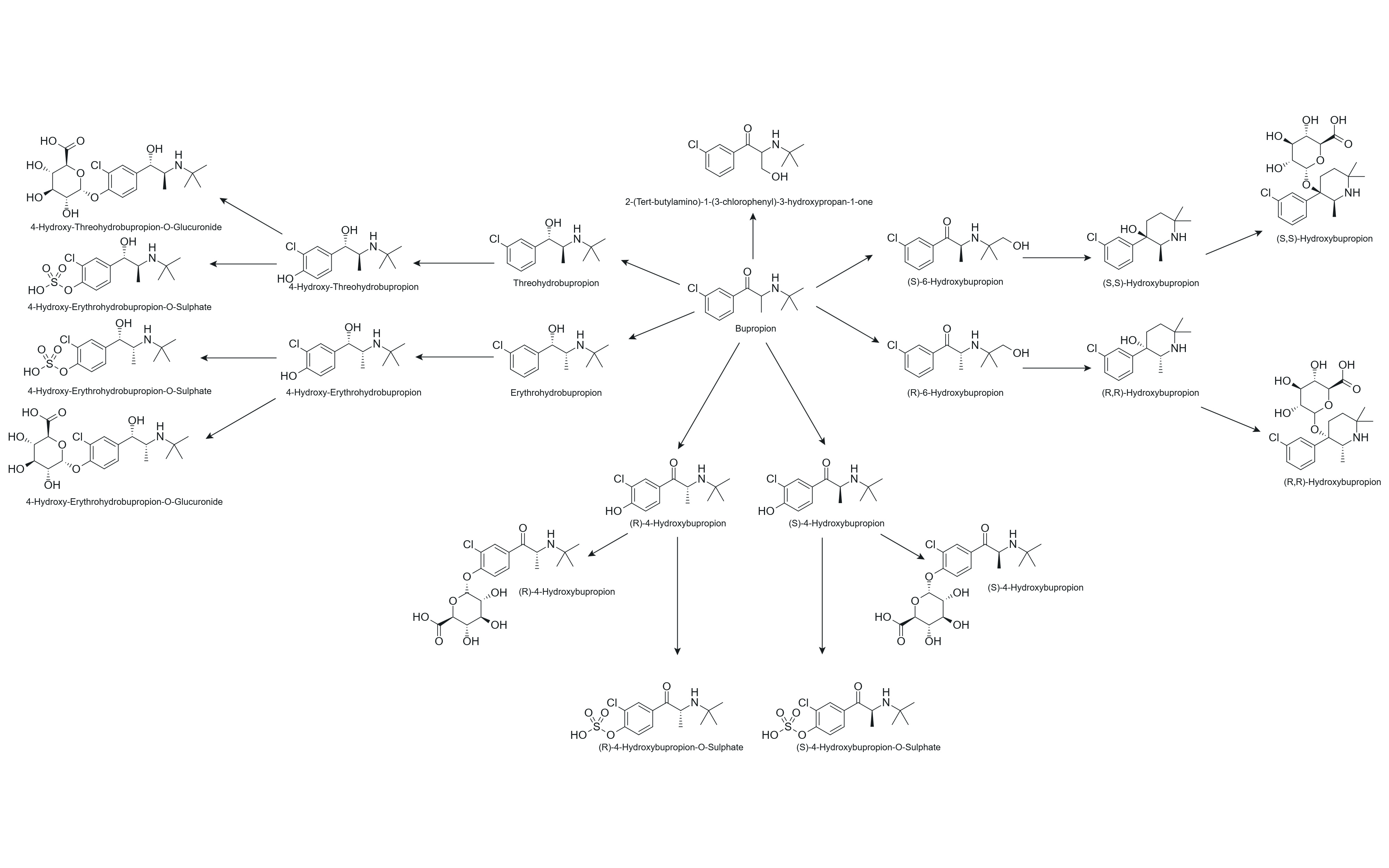
Pathways of bupropion metabolism

After oral administration, bupropion is rapidly and completely absorbed, reaching the peak blood plasma concentration after 1.5 hours (t_{max}). Sustained-release (SR) and extended-release (XL) formulations have been designed to slow down absorption, resulting in t_{max} of 3 hours and 5 hours, respectively. Absolute bioavailability of bupropion is unknown but is presumed to be low, at 5–20%, due to the first-pass metabolism. As for the relative bioavailability of the formulations, the XL formulation has lower bioavailability (68%) compared to the SR formulation and immediate release bupropion.

Bupropion is metabolized in the body by a variety of pathways. The oxidative pathways are by cytochrome P450 isoenzymes CYP2B6 leading to R,R- and S,S-hydroxybupropion and, to a lesser degree, CYP2C19 leading to 4'-hydroxybupropion. The reductive pathways are by 11β-hydroxysteroid dehydrogenase type 1 in the liver and AKR7A2/AKR7A3 in the intestine leading to threo-hydrobupropion and by yet unknown enzyme leading to erythro-hydrobupropion.

The metabolism of bupropion is highly variable: the effective doses of bupropion received by persons who ingest the same amount of the drug may differ by as much as 5.5 times (with a half-life of 12–30 hours), while the effective doses of hydroxybupropion may differ by as much as 7.5 times (with a half-life of 15–25 hours). Based on this, some researchers have advocated monitoring of the blood level of bupropion and hydroxybupropion.

The metabolism of bupropion also seems to follow biphasic pharmacokinetics: the redistribution alpha phase with half-life of about 1 hour precedes the metabolism beta phase of about 12–30 hours. This might explain why abuse is unfeasible due to a short "high", as well as support the use of extended-release formulas to maintain a consistent concentration of bupropion.

The metabolism of bupropion is highly species-dependent. As an example, oral bupropion results in hydroxybupropion levels that are 16-fold higher than those of bupropion itself in humans, whereas in rats, oral bupropion results in levels of bupropion that are 3.4-fold higher than those of hydroxybupropion. The species-dependent metabolism of bupropion is thought to be involved in species differences in its pharmacodynamic effects. For example, bupropion produces psychostimulant-like and reinforcing effects in rodents, whereas oral bupropion at therapeutic doses in humans seems to have much less or no potential for such effects. Bupropion has also been found to produce self-administration when given intravenously in monkeys.

== Chemistry ==
Skeletal formulae of individual bupropion enantiomers.

Ball-and-stick models of individual bupropion enantiomers.

Bupropion is an aminoketone that belongs to the class of substituted cathinones and the more general class of substituted phenethylamines. It is also known structurally as 3-chloro-N-tert-butyl-β-keto-α-methylphenethylamine, 3-chloro-N-tert-butyl-β-ketoamphetamine, or 3-chloro-N-tert-butylcathinone. The clinically used bupropion is racemic, which is a mixture of two enantiomers: S-bupropion and R-bupropion. Although the optical isomers of bupropion can be separated, they rapidly racemize under physiological conditions.

Bupropion is a small-molecule compound with the molecular formula C_{13}H_{18}ClNO and a molecular weight of 239.74 g/mol. It is a highly lipophilic compound, with an experimental log P of 3.6. Pharmaceutically, bupropion is used mainly as the hydrochloride salt but also to a lesser extent as the hydrobromide salt.

There have been reported cases of false-positive urine amphetamine tests in persons taking bupropion.

=== Synthesis ===
It is synthesized in two chemical steps starting from the phenone 3'-chloro-propiophenone. The alpha position adjacent to the ketone group is first brominated followed by nucleophilic displacement of the bromine atom of the resulting alpha-bromoketone group with t-butylamine and then treatment with hydrochloric acid to give bupropion as the hydrochloride salt in 75–85% overall yield.

Diagram showing the synthesis of bupropion from 3'-chloro-propiophenone. The α-carbon atom is an asymmetric one, tetraedrical HC*(CO)MeNH. So, bupropion is a chiral compound.

=== Analogues ===
A number of analogues of bupropion exist, such as hydroxybupropion, radafaxine, and manifaxine, among others. These compounds are norepinephrine–dopamine reuptake inhibitors (NDRIs) similarly to bupropion. The analogues of bupropion with the N-tert-butyl group removed or replaced with an N-methyl group, 3-chlorocathinone (3-CC) and 3-chloromethcathinone (3-CMC; clophedrone), respectively, are potent serotonin–norepinephrine–dopamine releasing agents (SNDRAs). They have been encountered as cathinone designer and recreational drugs. The analogue of bupropion with the N-tert-butyl group replaced with an N-cyclopropyl group is 3-chloro-N-cyclopropylcathinone (3Cl-CpC; PAL-433, RTI-6037-39). It is a hybrid serotonin releasing agent (SRA) and serotonin–norepinephrine–dopamine reuptake inhibitor (SNDRI) and was being investigated for potential treatment of cocaine dependence. One further analogue, RTI-6037-13, is the analogue of bupropion in which the methyl group at the α position has been elongated to a propyl group, with this drug acting as an NDRI and nicotinic inhibitor similarly to bupropion but with much greater dopaminergic potency and having been studied for potential use in smoking cessation and cocaine dependence. The analogues with an ethyl or butyl group at this position instead are RTI-6037-12 and RTI-6037-17, respectively, and have been described as well.

Chemical structures of bupropion analogues and derivatives
Bupropion

Hydroxybupropion

Radafaxine ((2S,3S)-hydroxybupropion; GW-353162)

Manifaxine (GW-320659)

3-Chlorophenmetrazine (3-CPM; PAL-594)

3-Chloroamphetamine (3-CA; PAL-304)

3-Chlorocathinone (3-CC)

3-Chloromethcathinone (3-CMC; clophedrone; PAL-434)

3-Chloro-N-cyclopropylcathinone (3Cl-CpC; PAL-433, RTI-6037-39)

RTI-6037-12

RTI-6037-13

RTI-6037-17

== History ==
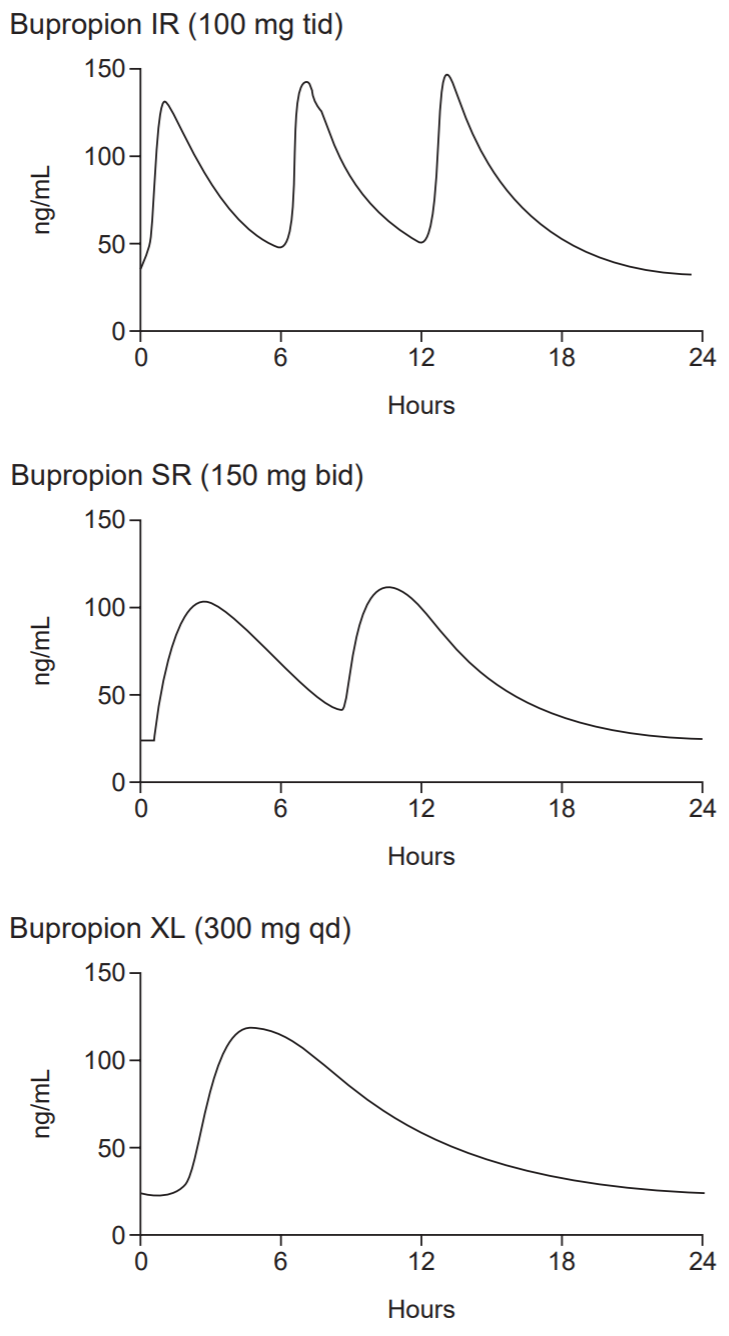
Comparison of steady-state blood plasma bupropion levels with bupropion IR 100 mg t.i.d. (3/day), bupropion SR 150 mg b.i.d. (2/day), and bupropion XL 300 mg q.d. (1/day) After swallowing, bupropion is rapidly and completely absorbed, reaching the peak blood plasma concentration after 1.5 hours (t_{max}). Sustained- and extended-release formulations slow down absorption, giving t_{max} of 3 h and 5 h, resp.

Bupropion was invented by Nariman Mehta of Burroughs Wellcome (now GlaxoSmithKline) in 1969, and the US patent for it was granted in 1974. It was approved by the US Food and Drug Administration (FDA) as an antidepressant on 30 December 1985, and marketed under the name Wellbutrin. However, a significant incidence of seizures at the originally recommended dosage (400–600 mg/day) caused the withdrawal of the drug in 1986. Subsequently, the risk of seizures was found to be highly dose-dependent, and bupropion was reintroduced to the market in 1989 with a lower maximum recommended daily dose of 450 mg/day.

In 1996, the US Food and Drug Administration (FDA) approved a sustained-release formulation of alcohol-resistant bupropion called Wellbutrin SR, a tablet intended to be taken twice a day (as compared with three times a day for immediate-release Wellbutrin). In 2003, the FDA approved another sustained-release formulation called Wellbutrin XL, a hard-shelled tablet intended for once-daily dosing. Wellbutrin SR and XL are available in generic form in the United States and Canada. In 1997, bupropion was approved by the FDA for use as a smoking cessation aid under the name Zyban. In 2006, Wellbutrin XL was similarly approved as a treatment for seasonal affective disorder.

In October 2007, two providers of consumer information on nutritional products and supplements, ConsumerLab.com and The People's Pharmacy, released the results of comparative tests of different brands of bupropion. The People's Pharmacy received multiple reports of increased side effects and decreased efficacy of generic bupropion, which prompted it to ask ConsumerLab.com to test the products in question. The tests showed that "one of a few generic versions of Wellbutrin XL 300 mg, sold as Budeprion XL 300 mg, didn't perform the same as the brand-name pill in the lab." The FDA investigated these complaints and concluded that Budeprion XL is equivalent to Wellbutrin XL regarding bioavailability of bupropion and its main active metabolite hydroxybupropion. The FDA also said that coincidental natural mood variation is the most likely explanation for the apparent worsening of depression after the switch from Wellbutrin XL to Budeprion XL. On 3 October 2012, however, the FDA reversed this opinion, announcing that "Budeprion XL 300 mg fails to demonstrate therapeutic equivalence to Wellbutrin XL 300 mg." The FDA did not test the bioequivalence of any of the other generic versions of Wellbutrin XL 300 mg, but requested that the four manufacturers submit data on this question to the FDA by March 2013. As of October 2013 the FDA has made determinations on the formulations from some manufacturers not being bioequivalent.

In April 2008, the FDA approved a formulation of bupropion as a hydrobromide salt instead of a hydrochloride salt, to be sold under the name Aplenzin by Sanofi-Aventis. It is an extended-release tablet intended for once-daily use. It was approved on the basis of bioequivalence with Wellbutrin XL.

In 2009, the FDA issued a health advisory warning that the prescription of bupropion for smoking cessation has been associated with reports of unusual behavior changes, agitation, and hostility. Some people, according to the advisory, have become depressed or have had their depression worsen, have had thoughts about suicide or dying, or have attempted suicide. This advisory was based on a review of anti-smoking products that identified 75 reports of "suicidal adverse events" for bupropion over ten years. Based on the results of follow-up trials this warning was removed in 2016.

In 2012, the US Justice Department announced that GlaxoSmithKline had agreed to plead guilty and pay a $3 billion fine, in part for promoting the unapproved use of Wellbutrin for weight loss and sexual dysfunction.

In 2017, the European Medicines Agency (EMA) recommended suspending a number of nationally approved medicines due to misrepresentation of bioequivalence study data by Micro Therapeutic Research Labs in India. The products recommended for suspension included several 300 mg modified-release bupropion tablets.

Following EMA's call for an industry-wide review of medicines for the possible presence of nitrosamines, GlaxoSmithKline paused batch release and distribution of bupropion 150 mg tablets in November 2022. In July 2023, EMA raised the acceptable daily intake of nitrosamine impurities, leading GlaxoSmithKline to announce that distribution of bupropion 150 mg tablets would resume "across the EU and Europe" by the end of 2023.

== Society and culture ==
=== Recreational use ===
Recreational use of bupropion is uncommon. While bupropion demonstrates some potential for recreational use, this potential is less than that of other commonly used stimulants, being limited by features of its pharmacology. Case reports describe the recreational use of bupropion as producing a "high" similar to cocaine or amphetamine usage but with less intensity. There have been some anecdotal and case-study reports of bupropion abuse, but the bulk of evidence indicates that the subjective effects of bupropion when taken orally are markedly different from those of addictive stimulants such as cocaine or amphetamine. However, bupropion, by non-conventional routes of administration like injection or insufflation, has been reported to be used recreationally in the United States and Canada, notably in prisons. Bupropion has also been encountered as a novel designer drug or adulterant in the United States and Europe.

=== Legal status ===
In Russia bupropion is treated as a banned narcotic drug, despite not appearing on official lists of narcotics, due to its similarity to ephedrone. In Australia, France, and the UK, smoking cessation is the only licensed use of bupropion, and no generics are marketed.

=== Brand names ===
Brand names include Wellbutrin, Aplenzin, and Zyban.

== Research ==
A meta-analysis concluded that it was effective and well-tolerated, especially for avoiding weight gain or sexual side effects.

Bupropion has been studied limitedly in the treatment of social anxiety disorder.

== See also ==
- List of antidepressants
