= Glucuronolactone reductase =

glucuronolactone reductase

Identifiers
- EC no.: 1.1.1.20
- CAS no.: 9028-30-2

Databases
- BRENDA: enzyme data
- ExPASy: NiceZyme view
- KEGG: enzyme entry
- MetaCyc: metabolic pathway
- Rhea: reactions
- PDB structures: RCSB PDB PDBe PDBsum
- Gene Ontology: AmiGO / QuickGO
Search
- PMC: articles
- PubMed: articles
- NCBI: proteins

Glucuronolactone reductase (EC 1.1.1.20) is a type of enzyme that in humans is encoded by the gene AKR1A1, and catalyzes the chemical reaction

L-gulono-1,4-lactone
+ NADP^{+}
H^{+}
H^{+}
D-glucurono-3,6-lactone
+ NADPH

The two substrates of this enzyme are L-gulono-1,4-lactone and oxidised nicotinamide adenine dinucleotide phosphate (NADP^{+}). Its products are [-glucurono-3,6-lactone, reduced NADPH, and a proton.

This enzyme belongs to the family of oxidoreductases, specifically those acting on the CH-OH group of donor with NAD^{+} or NADP^{+} as acceptor. The systematic name of this enzyme class is L-gulono-1,4-lactone:NADP^{+} 1-oxidoreductase. Other names in common use include GRase, and gulonolactone dehydrogenase. This enzyme participates in ascorbate and aldarate metabolism.
