= Hydroxybupropion =

Group of stereoisomers

Clinical data
- Other names: BW 306U; 6-Hydroxybupropion
- ATC code: None

Pharmacokinetic data
- Elimination half-life: 15–25 hours

Identifiers
- IUPAC name: (±)-1-(3-Chlorophenyl)-2-[(1-hydroxy-2-methyl-2-propanyl)amino]-1-propanone
- CAS Number: 357399-43-0
- PubChem CID: 446
- ChemSpider: 433
- UNII: V94F513635
- ChEBI: CHEBI:166487
- ChEMBL: ChEMBL3544616
- CompTox Dashboard (EPA): DTXSID101002894

Chemical and physical data
- Formula: C_{13}H_{18}ClNO_{2}
- Molar mass: 255.74 g·mol^{−1}
- 3D model (JSmol): Interactive image
- SMILES: O=C(c1cc(Cl)ccc1)C(NC(C)(C)CO)C
- InChI: InChI=1S/C13H18ClNO2/c1-9(15-13(2,3)8-16)12(17)10-5-4-6-11(14)7-10/h4-7,9,15-16H,8H2,1-3H3; Key:AKOAEVOSDHIVFX-UHFFFAOYSA-N

Hydroxybupropion (code name BW 306U), or 6-hydroxybupropion, is the major active metabolite of the antidepressant and smoking cessation drug bupropion. It is formed from bupropion by the liver enzyme CYP2B6 during first-pass metabolism. With oral bupropion treatment, hydroxybupropion is present in plasma at area under the curve concentrations that are as many as 16 to 20 times greater than those of bupropion itself, demonstrating extensive conversion of bupropion into hydroxybupropion in humans. As such, hydroxybupropion is likely to play a very important role in the effects of oral bupropion, which could accurately be thought of as functioning largely as a prodrug to hydroxybupropion.

Hydroxybupropion has two chiral centers and is a mixture of four possible enantiomers. In humans, however, presumably due to steric hindrance, only (2R,3R)-hydroxybupropion and (2S,3S)-hydroxybupropion are formed.

Other metabolites of bupropion besides hydroxybupropion include threohydrobupropion and erythrohydrobupropion.

== Pharmacology ==
Pharmacology of bupropion and its metabolites
	Bupropion	R,R- Hydroxy bupropion	S,S- Hydroxy bupropion	Threo- hydro bupropion	Erythro- hydro bupropion
Exposure and half-life
AUC relative to bupropion	1	23.8	0.6	11.2	2.5
Half-life	10.8 h	19 h	15 h	31 h	22 h
Inhibition IC_{50} (μM) in human cells, unless noted otherwise
DAT, uptake	0.66	inactive	0.63	47 (rat)	no data
NET, uptake	1.85	9.9	0.24	16 (rat)	no data
SERT, uptake	inactive	inactive	inactive	67 (rat)	no data
α_{3}β_{4} nicotinic	1.8	6.5	11	14 (rat)	no data
α_{4}β_{2} nicotinic	12	31	3.3	no data	no data
α_{1}β_{1}γδ nicotinic	7.9	7.6	28	no data	no data

=== Pharmacodynamics ===
Compared to bupropion, hydroxybupropion is similar in its potency as a norepinephrine reuptake inhibitor (IC_{50} = 1.7 μM), but is substantially weaker as a dopamine reuptake inhibitor (IC_{50} = >10 μM). Like bupropion, hydroxybupropion is also a non-competitive antagonist of nACh receptors, such as α_{4}β_{2} and α_{3}β_{4}, but is even more potent in comparison.

=== Pharmacokinetics ===
Bupropion is extensively and rapidly absorbed in the gastrointestinal tract but experiences extensive first pass metabolism rendering its systemic bioavailability limited. Exact bioavailability has yet to be determined given an intravenous form does not exist. Absorption is suggested to be between 80 and 90%. Its distribution half-life is between 3–4 hours and exhibits moderate human plasma protein binding (between 82 and 88%) with the parent compound and hydroxybupropion displaying the highest affinity. Bupropion is a racemic mixture and is metabolized hepatically primarily via oxidative cleavage of its side chains by CYP2B6. Hydroxybupropion is the most potent of the metabolites. It is formed via the "hydroxylation of the tert-butyl group" by CYP2B6 and is excreted renally. C_{max} values of hydroxybupropion are 4–7 times that of bupropion, while the exposure to hydroxybupropion is ten-fold that of bupropion. Hydroxybupropion's elimination half-life is roughly 20 hours, give or take five hours, and it reaches steady-state concentrations within eight days.

== Chemistry ==
Hydroxybupropion is a racemic mixture of (R,R)-hydroxybupropion and (S,S)-hydroxybupropion.

== Research ==
Although there are patents proposing uses and formulations of this compound, hydroxybupropion is not currently marketed as a drug in and of itself and is only available for use in non-clinical research. Hydroxybupropion is not a scheduled drug or a controlled substance. One can access GLP (Good Lab Practice) documents detailing assays/techniques to further research and isolate this drug. Otherwise, there is little regulatory data available for hydroxybupropion at this time. Moreover, there is little information to suggest hydroxybupropion has an abuse potential. However, it has been studied as a possible therapeutic for alcohol and nicotine use as a codrug.

There are few clinical trials or toxicology studies assessing hydroxybupropion alone at this time. There are clinical studies which assess hydroxybupropion in conjunction with bupropion suggesting hydroxybupropion to be the primary form of the compound responsible for its clinical efficacy. Also, transdermal delivery of bupropion and hydroxybupropion has been assessed finding bupropion to be the superior candidate given its elevated diffusion rate through skin samples. There are few toxicology studies assessing hydroxybupropion alone at this time. However, there are some studies which assess this compound in conjunction with others or its parent compound.

== See also ==
- Substituted cathinone
- Radafaxine – a cyclised derivative of hydroxybupropion
- Manifaxine – an analogue of radafaxine and hydroxybupropion
