= CHRND =

Protein-coding gene in humans

Identifiers
- Aliases: CHRND, ACHRD, CMS2A, FCCMS, SCCMS, CMS3A, CMS3B, CMS3C, cholinergic receptor nicotinic delta subunit
- External IDs: OMIM: 100720; MGI: 87893; GeneCards: CHRND

Gene location (Human)
Chr.	Chromosome 2 (human)
Band	2q37.1	Start	232,525,993 bp
Band	2q37.1	End	232,536,667 bp

Gene location (Mouse)
Chr.	Chromosome 1 (mouse)
Band	1 C5|1 44.07 cM	Start	87,118,329 bp
Band	1 C5|1 44.07 cM	End	87,127,792 bp
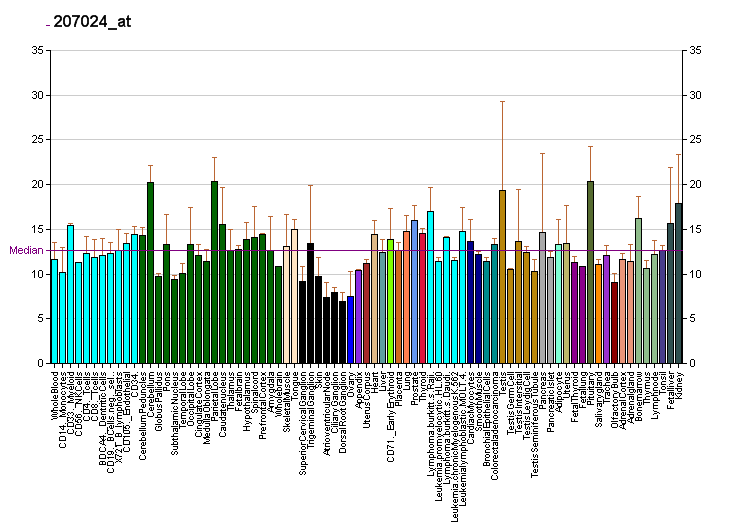
RNA expression pattern
Bgee	Human / Mouse (ortholog); Top expressed in: gastrocnemius muscle; muscle of thigh; testicle; glutes; skeletal muscle tissue; tibialis anterior muscle; mucosa of nose; granulocyte; hypothalamus; blood / Top expressed in: secondary oocyte; tongue muscle; zygote; embryo; primary oocyte; muscle of thigh; esophagus; lip; somite; skeletal muscle tissue; More reference expression data
BioGPS	More reference expression data
Gene ontology
Molecular function	acetylcholine binding; ion channel activity; extracellular ligand-gated ion channel activity; ligand-gated ion channel activity; acetylcholine-gated cation-selective channel activity; transmembrane signaling receptor activity; acetylcholine receptor activity; transmitter-gated ion channel activity involved in regulation of postsynaptic membrane potential
Cellular component	integral component of membrane; postsynaptic membrane; membrane; synapse; cell junction; acetylcholine-gated channel complex; nucleoplasm; cytosol; plasma membrane; neuromuscular junction; integral component of postsynaptic specialization membrane; integral component of plasma membrane; neuron projection
Biological process	muscle contraction; regulation of membrane potential; skeletal muscle contraction; response to nicotine; cation transport; synaptic transmission, cholinergic; ion transport; skeletal muscle tissue growth; neuromuscular synaptic transmission; neuromuscular process; musculoskeletal movement; signal transduction; regulation of postsynaptic membrane potential; excitatory postsynaptic potential; cation transmembrane transport; ion transmembrane transport; chemical synaptic transmission; nervous system process
Sources:Amigo / QuickGO
Orthologs
Databases	NCBI: entry; OMA: entry
Species	Human	Mouse
Entrez	1144	11447
Ensembl	ENSG00000135902	ENSMUSG00000026251
UniProt	Q07001	P02716
RefSeq (mRNA)	NM_000751; NM_001256657; NM_001311195; NM_001311196	NM_021600
RefSeq (protein)	NP_000742; NP_001243586; NP_001298124; NP_001298125	NP_067611
Location (UCSC)	Chr 2: 232.53 – 232.54 Mb	Chr 1: 87.12 – 87.13 Mb
PubMed search
- Wikidata
View/Edit Human	View/Edit Mouse

Acetylcholine receptor subunit delta is a protein that in humans is encoded by the CHRND gene.

== Function ==
The acetylcholine receptor of muscle has 5 subunits of 4 different types: 2 alpha and 1 each of beta, gamma and delta subunits. After acetylcholine binding, the receptor undergoes an extensive conformation change that affects all subunits and leads to opening of an ion-conducting channel across the plasma membrane.

== Interactions ==
CHRND has been shown to interact with Cholinergic receptor, nicotinic, alpha 1.

== Clinical significance ==
Mutations in CHRND are known to cause the following conditions:

- Multiple pterygium syndrome, lethal type (LMPS);
- Myasthenic syndrome, congenital, 3A, slow-channel (CMS3A);
- Myasthenic syndrome, congenital, 3B, fast-channel (CMS3B);
- Myasthenic syndrome, congenital, 3C, associated with acetylcholine receptor deficiency (CMS3C).

== See also ==
- Nicotinic acetylcholine receptor
