= Nariman Mehta =

Indian-born American chemist (1920–2014)

Nariman Bomanshaw Mehta
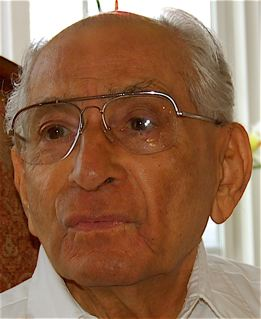
- Mehta in 2008
- Born: April 20, 1920; Bombay, Bombay Presidency, British India
- Died: August 22, 2014 (aged 94); Burlington, North Carolina, U.S.
- Education: St. Xavier's College, Mumbai, University of Kansas
- Known for: Synthesis of antidepressant drug Bupropion (marketed as Wellbutrin)
- Spouse: Barbara DeShane
- Children: 2 daughters, 1 son
- Scientific career
- Fields: Organic chemistry
- Workplaces: Seagram, GlaxoSmithKline

Nariman Bomanshaw Mehta (April 20, 1920 – August 22, 2014) was an Indian-born American organic chemist and pharmacologist who designed, synthesized, and patented the organic compound bupropion, marketed under the name Wellbutrin as an antidepressant and smoking cessation aid.

== Early life and education ==
Mehta was born in Bombay, India into a Parsi Zoroastrian family. He attended St. Xavier's College in Bombay, from where he received Bachelor of Science degrees in chemistry and physics and Bachelor of Arts degrees in English and economics, and a Master of Science degree. In 1939, he and fellow student Kaikhosrov D. Irani, later a noted academic in his own right, wrote and published a Textbook of Theoretical and Practical Physics.

Mehta won a Tata Scholarship and received a grant from Wendell Willkie. In 1947 Mehta went to the United States, where he earned a PhD in chemistry from The University of Kansas. Mehta's 1952 dissertation was titled I. Use of the Hammett equation in the prediction of product ratios in the Schmidt reaction of unsymmetrical diarylethylenes: II. The synthesis of possible emetine intermediates.

He had two daughters and a son.

== Career ==
Seagram invited Mehta to the United States as a trainee in their research lab, where he learned about fermentation and distillation. During his time at Seagram, Mehta studied the antibiotic Penicillin. While teaching chemistry at Central State University, Wilberforce, Ohio, Mehta joined the pharmaceutical company Burroughs Wellcome, Inc., now GlaxoSmithKline, where he worked on potential neuropsychopharmacological drugs and designed, synthesized, and patented (in 1969) the compound Bupropion (BW 323U66) that was approved for use as an antidepressant in 1985 and sold under the trade name Wellbutrin. Another application of the drug was as a smoking cessation aid.

== Selected publications ==
- Mehta, N B (1983), "The Chemistry of Bupropion", The Journal of Clinical Psychiatry, vol. 44, no. 5 (published May 1983), pp. 56–9, PMID 6406464
- David L. Musso; Nariman B. Mehta; Francis E. Soroko; Robert M. Ferris; Elizabeth B. Hollingsworth; Bernard T. Kenney (2004), "Synthesis and evaluation of the antidepressant activity of the enantiomers of bupropion", Chirality, 5 (7) (published 2004-09-21): 495–500, doi:10.1002/chir.530050704, PMID 8240925
- Mehta, Nariman B; Arthur P Phillips; Florence Fu Lui; Ronald E Brooks (1960), "Maleamic and citraconamic acids, methyl esters, and imides", The Journal of Organic Chemistry, 25 (6): 1012–1015, doi:10.1021/jo01076a038

== Notes ==
=== References ===
- "Dr. Nariman B. Mehta: A scientist and a chemist".
- Schatzberg, Alan F.; Nemeroff, Charles B. (2009). The American Psychiatric Publishing Textbook of Psychopharmacology (4 ed.). American Psychiatric Publishing, Inc. p. 416. ISBN 978-1585623099.
- Wilson, Brent; Paul, Panchajanya; Mehta, Sunny; Coffey, Barbara (February 2013). "Hypokalemia Secondary to Bupropion Sustained Release Overdose". Journal of Child and Adolescent Psychopharmacology. 23 (1): 57–60. doi:10.1089/cap.2013.2313. PMC 3613169. PMID 23410142.
