= RTI-6037-13 =

Clinical data
- Other names: 3Cl-NtBu-VP; 3′-Chloro-2-(tert-butylamino)pentanophenone; 4-Chloro-N-tert-butyl-α-propyl-β-ketophenethylamine; α-Desmethyl-α-propylbupropion
- Drug class: Norepinephrine–dopamine reuptake inhibitor; Stimulant
- ATC code: None

Identifiers
- IUPAC name: 2-(tert-butylamino)-1-(3-chlorophenyl)pentan-1-one
- PubChem CID: 3029724
- ChemSpider: 2295010
- ChEMBL: ChEMBL569465

Chemical and physical data
- Formula: C_{15}H_{22}ClNO
- Molar mass: 267.80 g·mol^{−1}
- 3D model (JSmol): Interactive image
- SMILES: CCCC(C(=O)C1=CC(=CC=C1)Cl)NC(C)(C)C
- InChI: InChI=InChI=1S/C15H22ClNO/c1-5-7-13(17-15(2,3)4)14(18)11-8-6-9-12(16)10-11/h6,8-10,13,17H,5,7H2,1-4H3; Key:PREYWAJYVTVVPE-UHFFFAOYSA-N

RTI-6037-13, also known as 3′-chloro-2-(tert-butylamino)pentanophenone or as α-desmethyl-α-propylbupropion, is a norepinephrine–dopamine reuptake inhibitor (NDRI) and stimulant of the cathinone family and a bupropion analogue; this compound is related to pyrrolidinophenone (it is an α-propylphenethylamine) which has been proposed for use as a treatment for smoking cessation and as a potential treatment for cocaine dependence. It is 29-fold more potent than bupropion as a dopamine reuptake inhibitor in vitro, but shows about the same potency as bupropion as a norepinephrine reuptake inhibitor, making it 14-fold selective for inhibiting dopamine over norepinephrine reuptake.

== Pharmacology ==
=== Pharmacodynamics ===
RTI-6037-13 is a central nervous system stimulant; it acts as a norepinephrine–dopamine reuptake inhibitor. It is more effective at inhibiting the dopamine transporter than bupropion and cocaine, and more effective at inhibiting the norepinephrine transporter than bupropion, but not as effective as cocaine. The binding affinities (K_{i}) for the norepinephrine and dopamine transporters were 96 ± 20 nM and 1,171 ± 260 nM, respectively, whilst the IC_{50} values (for catecholamine reuptake) for RTI-6037-13 were 33 ± 7 nM and 472 ± 93 nM for dopamine and norepinephrine, respectively. It had no affinity for the serotonin transporter. RTI-6037-13 is a nicotinic antagonist. It blocks nicotinic receptors; it blocks the α3β4 receptor with an IC_{50} value of 0.70 µM (2.5 times more potent than bupropion), and is more effective than bupropion at blocking the α4β2 receptor (7.7 µM versus 12 µM for bupropion). It blocked the α4β4 receptor with an affinity of 2 µM.

RTI-6037-13 has an ED_{50} (half-maximal effective dose) of 15.5 mg/kg. This means that it is approximately half as potent as cocaine (7.8 mg/kg), and almost three times less potent than bupropion (5.5 mg/kg) — that is, a higher dose is required to achieve 50 per cent of its maximum effect; at the peak of its activity, RTI-6037-13 reaches 108 per cent of the maximum effect of cocaine. This shows that, in terms of its maximum stimulant potency, it is practically equivalent to cocaine (and surpasses bupropion, for which this figure is 87 per cent), RTI-6037-13 has a delayed onset of maximum effect, which occurs only 90–120 minutes after administration; RTI-6037-13 effect lasts from 210 to 480 minutes (up to 8 hours), which significantly exceeds the duration of action of cocaine (40–100 minutes) and bupropion (130–270 minutes).

The results of a drug discrimination test in rats (the subjective effect of the substance on cocaine-induced stimulation) are known; RTI-6037-13 is approximately four times weaker than cocaine in its ability to induce similar subjective sensations, but stronger than bupropion; following administration of a 25 mg/kg dose, the overall frequency of lever presses (the rat’s behavioural activity) increased, RTI-6037-13 acted as a potent stimulant.

== History ==
RTI-6037-13 was first described in the scientific literature by 2009.

== See also ==
- Substituted cathinone
- Substituted α-propylphenethylamine
- RTI-6037-39
