= Erythrohydrobupropion =

Substituted amphetamine derivative

- (1S,2R)-Erythrohydrobupropion

Clinical data
- Other names: erythro-Hydrobupropion; Erythrohydroxybupropion; BW 287; BW 17U; erythro-3-Chloro-N-tert-butyl-β-hydroxy-α-methylphenethylamine; erythro-3-Chloro-N-tert-butyl-β-hydroxyamphetamine

Pharmacokinetic data
- Metabolism: Hydroxylation (CYP2B6, CYP2C19), glucuronidation (UGTs)
- Elimination half-life: 33 hours

Identifiers
- IUPAC name: rel-(1R^{*},2S^{*})-2-(tert-Butylamino)-1-(3-chlorophenyl)propan-1-ol
- CAS Number: 99102-04-2 (racemic) 102141-11-7 (1S,2R) 292055-72-2 (1R,2S)
- PubChem CID: 9899562
- ChemSpider: 8010403
- UNII: YI65RR2TFJ
- ChEMBL: ChEMBL1304

Chemical and physical data
- Formula: C_{13}H_{20}ClNO
- Molar mass: 241.76 g·mol^{−1}
- 3D model (JSmol): Interactive image
- SMILES: [C@H]([C@H](NC(C)(C)C)C)(O)C1=CC(Cl)=CC=C1
- InChI: InChI=1/C13H20ClNO/c1-9(15-13(2,3)4)12(16)10-6-5-7-11(14)8-10/h5-9,12,15-16H,1-4H3/t9-,12-/s2; Key:NDPTTXIBLSWNSF-RKRUEEIYNA-N

Erythrohydrobupropion (developmental codes BW 287, BW 17U) is a substituted amphetamine derivative—specifically a β-hydroxyamphetamine—and a minor active metabolite of the antidepressant drug bupropion (Wellbutrin). Bupropion is a norepinephrine–dopamine reuptake inhibitor and nicotinic acetylcholine receptor negative allosteric modulator, with its metabolites contributing substantially to its activities. Erythrohydrobupropion exists as a racemic mixture of two stereoisomers, (1R,2S)-erythrohydrobupropion and (1S,2R)-erythrohydrobupropion. Other metabolites of bupropion include hydroxybupropion and threohydrobupropion.

Information on the pharmacological actions of erythrohydrobupropion is scarce. In any case, it is about 20% as pharmacologically potent as bupropion and in the range of 20 to 50% as potent as bupropion in mouse models of depression. It circulates at similar concentrations as bupropion during bupropion therapy. Conversely, two other metabolites, hydroxybupropion and threohydrobupropion, circulate at higher concentrations than bupropion.

Erythrohydrobupropion is formed from bupropion via reduction of the ketone group primarily by 11β-hydroxysteroid dehydrogenase-1 and to a minor extent by aldo-keto reductases. It can also be formed from bupropion by carbonyl reductases. The compound is metabolized by the cytochrome P450 enzymes CYP2B6 and CYP2C19 into erythro-4'-hydroxy-hydrobupropion and by various glucuronosyltransferase enzymes into glucuronide conjugates. The elimination half-life of erythrohydrobupropion is approximately 33 hours. Its half-life may be longer in older people.

Insomnia during bupropion therapy has been associated with erythrohydrobupropion concentrations. Administration of erythrohydrobupropion in mice produces seizures at sufficiently high doses similarly to bupropion and other metabolites. Erythrohydrobupropion is a CYP2D6 inhibitor and accounts for about 9% of CYP2D6 inhibition during bupropion therapy, with hydroxybupropion accounting for 65% and threohydrobupropion accounting for 21%.
