= AKR7A3 =

Protein-coding gene in humans

Identifiers
- Aliases: AKR7A3, AFAR2, aldo-keto reductase family 7, member A3 (aflatoxin aldehyde reductase), aldo-keto reductase family 7 member A3
- External IDs: OMIM: 608477; GeneCards: AKR7A3
Available structures
PDB	Human UniProt search: PDBe RCSB
PDB	List of PDB id codes 2CLP
Enzyme activity
EC #	BRENDA	ExPASy	KEGG	MetaCyc
1.1.1.2	↗	↗	↗	↗

Gene location (Human)
Chr.	Chromosome 1 (human)
Band	1p36.13	Start	19,282,573 bp
Band	1p36.13	End	19,288,770 bp
RNA expression pattern
Bgee	Human / Mouse (ortholog); Top expressed in: duodenum; jejunal mucosa; body of pancreas; mucosa of transverse colon; right lobe of liver; mucosa of ileum; pancreatic ductal cell; human kidney; cardia; body of stomach / n/a; More reference expression data
BioGPS	n/a
Gene ontology
Molecular function	electron transfer activity; oxidoreductase activity; aldo-keto reductase (NADP) activity; protein binding; identical protein binding; alditol:NADP+ 1-oxidoreductase activity
Cellular component	cytoplasm; extracellular exosome; cytosol
Biological process	xenobiotic metabolic process; cellular aldehyde metabolic process; electron transport chain; aflatoxin metabolic process; aflatoxin catabolic process
Sources:Amigo / QuickGO
Orthologs
Databases	NCBI: entry; OMA: entry
Species	Human	Mouse
Entrez	22977	n/a
Ensembl	ENSG00000162482	n/a
UniProt	O95154	n/a
RefSeq (mRNA)	NM_012067	n/a
RefSeq (protein)	NP_036199	n/a
Location (UCSC)	Chr 1: 19.28 – 19.29 Mb	n/a
PubMed search		n/a
- Wikidata
View/Edit Human

Aldo-keto reductase family 7 member A3 is an enzyme that in humans is encoded by the AKR7A3 gene. This enzyme functions to detoxify certain aldehydes ketones by converting them to their alcohol equivalents.

== Function ==
AKR7A3 functions is part of the enzyme class alcohol dehydrogenase (NADP+) (EC 1.1.1.2), and catalyzes the reaction:

a primary alcohol + NADP^{+} = an aldehyde + NADPH + H^{+}

In humans, AKR7A3 and the multi-functional enzyme AKR1A1 are the only reported proteins that catalyze this reaction, and both catalyze the reverse reaction: producing alcohols from aldehydes.
