= AKR1A1 =

Mammalian protein found in humans

Identifiers
- Aliases: AKR1A1, ALDR1, ALR, ARM, DD3, HEL-S-6, Aldo-keto reductase family 1, member A1, aldo-keto reductase family 1, member A1 (aldehyde reductase), aldo-keto reductase family 1 member A1
- External IDs: OMIM: 103830; MGI: 1929955; GeneCards: AKR1A1
Available structures
PDB	Ortholog search: PDBe RCSB
PDB	List of PDB id codes 2ALR
Enzyme activity
EC #	BRENDA	ExPASy	KEGG	MetaCyc
1.1.1.2	↗	↗	↗	↗
1.1.1.19	↗	↗	↗	↗
1.1.1.20	↗	↗	↗	↗
1.1.1.54	↗	↗	↗	↗
1.1.1.372	↗	↗	↗	↗

Gene location (Human)
Chr.	Chromosome 1 (human)
Band	1p34.1	Start	45,550,543 bp
Band	1p34.1	End	45,570,049 bp

Gene location (Mouse)
Chr.	Chromosome 4 (mouse)
Band	4|4 D1	Start	116,493,707 bp
Band	4|4 D1	End	116,508,877 bp
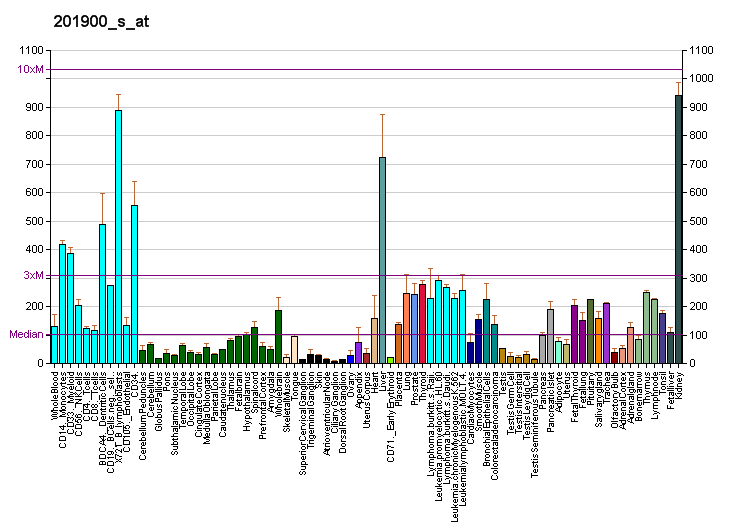
RNA expression pattern
Bgee	Human / Mouse (ortholog); Top expressed in: kidney tubule; nasal epithelium; mucosa of ileum; right lobe of liver; palpebral conjunctiva; human kidney; body of pancreas; glomerulus; mucosa of transverse colon; parotid gland / Top expressed in: barrel cortex; vestibular sensory epithelium; medullary collecting duct; Epithelium of choroid plexus; external carotid artery; utricle; superior cervical ganglion; condyle; conjunctival fornix; iris; More reference expression data
BioGPS	More reference expression data
Gene ontology
Molecular function	alditol:NADP+ 1-oxidoreductase activity; electron transfer activity; oxidoreductase activity; alcohol dehydrogenase (NADP+) activity; protein binding; aldo-keto reductase (NADP) activity; L-glucuronate reductase activity; glucuronolactone reductase activity; NAD-retinol dehydrogenase activity; allyl-alcohol dehydrogenase activity
Cellular component	cytosol; extracellular exosome; apical plasma membrane; extracellular space; synapse; cytoplasm; plasma membrane; membrane
Biological process	cellular aldehyde metabolic process; aldehyde catabolic process; D-glucuronate catabolic process; L-ascorbic acid biosynthetic process; glutathione derivative biosynthetic process; glucuronate catabolic process to xylulose 5-phosphate; glucose metabolic process; electron transport chain; cellular detoxification of aldehyde; daunorubicin metabolic process; doxorubicin metabolic process
Sources:Amigo / QuickGO
Orthologs
Databases	NCBI: entry; OMA: entry
Species	Human	Mouse
Entrez	10327	58810
Ensembl	ENSG00000117448	ENSMUSG00000028692
UniProt	P14550	Q9JII6
RefSeq (mRNA)	NM_001202413; NM_001202414; NM_006066; NM_153326	NM_021473
RefSeq (protein)	NP_001189342; NP_001189343; NP_006057; NP_697021	NP_067448
Location (UCSC)	Chr 1: 45.55 – 45.57 Mb	Chr 4: 116.49 – 116.51 Mb
PubMed search
- Wikidata
View/Edit Human	View/Edit Mouse

Alcohol dehydrogenase [NADP+] also known as aldehyde reductase or aldo-keto reductase family 1 member A1 is an enzyme that in humans is encoded by the AKR1A1 gene. AKR1A1 belongs to the aldo-keto reductase (AKR) superfamily. It catalyzes the NADPH-dependent reduction of a variety of aromatic and aliphatic aldehydes to their corresponding alcohols and catalyzes the reduction of mevaldate to mevalonic acid and of glyceraldehyde to glycerol. Mutations in the AKR1A1 gene has been found associated with non-Hodgkin's lymphoma.

== Structure ==
=== Gene ===
The AKR1A1 gene lies on the chromosome location of 1p34.1 and consists of 10 exons.

=== Protein ===
AKR1A1 consists of 325 amino acids and weighs 36,573 Da. The tertiary structure consists of a beta/alpha-barrel, with the coenzyme-binding site located at the carboxy-terminus end of the strands of the barrel. Alternative splicing of this gene results in two transcript variants encoding the same protein.

== Function ==
AKR1A1 gene is found highly expressed in kidney and liver, and moderately expressed in cerebrum, small intestine and testis. Small amounts of AKR1A1 are present in lung, prostate and spleen. However, it is not observed in heart or skeletal muscle. AKR1A1 belongs to the AKR superfamily, which are predominantly monomeric, soluble, NADPH-dependent oxidoreductases involved in the reduction of aldehydes and ketones into primary and secondary alcohols. AKR1A1 is shown to demonstrate characteristically high specific activity towards many aromatic and aliphatic aldehydes, and preferentially catalyses the NADPH-dependent reduction of aliphatic aldehydes, aromatic aldehydes and biogenic amines. It is also reported to be involved in the metabolism of 4-hydroxynonenal and play a role in the resistance to oxidative stress.

=== Alcohol dehydrogenases (NADP+) ===
More broadly, alcohol dehydrogenases (NADP+) (EC 1.1.1.2), also called aldehyde reductases (NADPH), are a type of enzyme that are similar to alcohol dehydrogenase (NAD+) (EC 1.1.1.1) but utilize the phosphorylated cofactor NADP. They catalyze the reaction:

a primary alcohol + NADP^{+} = an aldehyde + NADPH + H^{+}

In humans, this kind of reaction is catalyzed by AKR1A1 and AKR7A3, and both catalyze the reverse reaction: producing alcohols from aldehydes.

== Clinical significance ==
A SNP in intron 5 of AKR1A1 has been found to be significantly associated with increased risk of non-Hodgkin's lymphoma. AKR1A1 could activate procarcinogens, such as polycyclic aromatic hydrocarbon. AKRs have been linked to metabolism of the anthracyclines doxorubicin (DOX) and daunorubicin (DAUN), allelic variants showed significantly reduced metabolic activities, and hence these allelic variants can possibly act as genetic biomarkers for the clinical development of DAUN-induced cardiotoxicity.

== Interactions ==
AKR1A1 interacts with 4-hydroxynonenal, polycyclic aromatic hydrocarbons, and DAUN.
