= Threohydrobupropion =

Metabolite of bupropion

- (1S,2S)-Threohydrobupropion

Clinical data
- Other names: threo-Hydrobupropion; Threohydroxybupropion; BW 494; BW A494U; threo-3-Chloro-N-tert-butyl-β-hydroxy-α-methylphenethylamine; threo-3-Chloro-N-tert-butyl-β-hydroxyamphetamine

Pharmacokinetic data
- Protein binding: 42%
- Metabolism: Hydroxylation (CYP2B6, CYP2C19), glucuronidation (UGTs)
- Elimination half-life: 37 hours

Identifiers
- IUPAC name: rel-(1R^{*},2R^{*})-2-(tert-Butylamino)-1-(3-chlorophenyl)propan-1-ol
- CAS Number: 92264-82-9 (racemate) 153365-82-3 (R,R) 102141-12-8 (S,S)
- PubChem CID: 9943534
- ChemSpider: 8010403
- UNII: 988C8SFV4F
- ChEMBL: ChEMBL1304
- CompTox Dashboard (EPA): DTXSID70431488
- ECHA InfoCard: 100.216.731

Chemical and physical data
- Formula: C_{13}H_{20}ClNO
- Molar mass: 241.76 g·mol^{−1}
- 3D model (JSmol): Interactive image
- SMILES: [C@H]([C@@H](NC(C)(C)C)C)(O)C1=CC(Cl)=CC=C1
- InChI: InChI=1/C13H20ClNO/c1-9(15-13(2,3)4)12(16)10-6-5-7-11(14)8-10/h5-9,12,15-16H,1-4H3/t9-,12+/s2; Key:NDPTTXIBLSWNSF-JVMLCUHDNA-N

Threohydrobupropion (developmental code names BW 494, BW A494U) is a substituted amphetamine derivative—specifically a β-hydroxyamphetamine—and a major active metabolite of the antidepressant drug bupropion (Wellbutrin). Bupropion is a norepinephrine–dopamine reuptake inhibitor and nicotinic acetylcholine receptor negative allosteric modulator, with its metabolites contributing substantially to its activities.

== Chemistry ==
Threohydrobupropion exists as a racemic mixture of two stereoisomers, (1R,2R)-threohydrobupropion and (1S,2S)-threohydrobupropion. Other metabolites of bupropion include hydroxybupropion and erythrohydrobupropion.

== Pharmacology ==
Information on the pharmacological actions of threohydrobupropion is scarce. In any case, it is about 20% as pharmacologically potent as bupropion and in the range of 20 to 50% as potent as bupropion in mouse models of depression. Moreover, threohydrobupropion has been reported to weakly inhibit the reuptake of norepinephrine, dopamine, and serotonin with rat IC_{50} or K_{i} values of 16 μM, 47 μM, and 67 μM, respectively. These values can be compared to rat values with bupropion of 1,400 nM, 570 nM, and 19,000 nM, respectively. Besides monoamine reuptake inhibition, threohydrobupropion has also been reported to inhibit α_{3}β_{4} nicotinic acetylcholine receptors, with an IC_{50} value of 14 μM. Threohydrobupropion circulates at higher concentrations than bupropion during bupropion therapy, similarly to hydroxybupropion but in contrast to erythrohydrobupropion—which circulates at similar concentrations as bupropion.

The plasma protein binding of threohydrobupropion is 42%. Threohydrobupropion is formed from bupropion via reduction of the ketone group by 11β-hydroxysteroid dehydrogenase-1 and aldo-keto reductases. It can also be formed from bupropion by carbonyl reductases. The compound is metabolized by the cytochrome P450 enzymes CYP2B6 and CYP2C19 into threo-4'-hydroxy-hydrobupropion and by various glucuronosyltransferase enzymes into glucuronide conjugates. Its elimination half-life is approximately 37 hours.

Dry mouth during bupropion therapy has been associated with threohydrobupropion concentrations. Administration of threohydrobupropion in mice produces seizures at sufficiently high doses similarly to bupropion and other metabolites. Threohydrobupropion is a CYP2D6 inhibitor and accounts for about 21% of CYP2D6 inhibition during bupropion therapy, with hydroxybupropion accounting for 65% and erythrohydrobupropion accounting for 9%.
