= Ethachlor =

Weed control herbicide

Names
- IUPAC name 2-Chloro-N-(ethoxymethyl)-2′-ethylacetanilide
- Preferred IUPAC name 2-Chloro-N-(ethoxymethyl)-N-(2-ethylphenyl)acetamide
- Other names: 克草胺 (Chinese)

Identifiers
CAS Number	51218-31-6
3D model (JSmol)	Interactive image
ChemSpider	14517211
PubChem CID	19992632
CompTox Dashboard (EPA)	DTXSID601337301
- InChI: InChI=1S/C13H18ClNO2/c1-3-11-7-5-6-8-12(11)15(10-17-4-2)13(16)9-14/h5-8H,3-4,9-10H2,1-2H3 Key: QJTJSFKYIUWWJE-UHFFFAOYSA-N
- SMILES: CCC1=CC=CC=C1N(COCC)C(=O)CCl

Properties
Chemical formula	C_{13}H_{18}ClNO_{2}
Molar mass	255.74 g·mol^{−1}
- Except where otherwise noted, data are given for materials in their standard state (at 25 °C [77 °F], 100 kPa). Infobox references

Ethachlor is a chloroacetamide herbicide used in China.

Ethachlor's HRAC group is Group K (Australia), Group K3 (Global) and Group 15 (numeric).
