= Radafaxine =

Chemical compound

Clinical data
- Other names: (S,S)-Hydroxybupropion; (2S,3S)-Hydroxybupropion; GW-353,162; GW-353162; GW353162
- Routes of administration: Oral
- Drug class: Norepinephrine–dopamine reuptake inhibitor (NDRI); Antidepressant
- ATC code: None

Identifiers
- IUPAC name: (+)-(2S,3S)-2-(3-chlorophenyl)-3,5,5-trimethylmorpholin-2-ol
- CAS Number: 192374-14-4; HCl: 106083-71-0
- PubChem CID: 9795056
- ChemSpider: 7970823
- UNII: Q47741214K; HCl: SYD411HZ3S
- ChEMBL: ChEMBL1172928
- CompTox Dashboard (EPA): DTXSID501318447

Chemical and physical data
- Formula: C_{13}H_{18}ClNO_{2}
- Molar mass: 255.74 g·mol^{−1}
- 3D model (JSmol): Interactive image
- SMILES: Clc1cccc(c1)[C@]2(O)OCC(N[C@H]2C)(C)C
- InChI: InChI=1S/C13H18ClNO2/c1-9-13(16,17-8-12(2,3)15-9)10-5-4-6-11(14)7-10/h4-7,9,15-16H,8H2,1-3H3/t9-,13+/m0/s1; Key:RCOBKSKAZMVBHT-TVQRCGJNSA-N

Radafaxine (developmental code GW-353,162; also known as (2S,3S)-hydroxybupropion or (S,S)-hydroxybupropion) is a norepinephrine–dopamine reuptake inhibitor (NDRI) which was under development by GlaxoSmithKline in the 2000s for a variety of different indications but was never marketed. These uses included treatment of restless legs syndrome, major depressive disorder, bipolar disorder, neuropathic pain, fibromyalgia, and obesity. Regulatory filing was planned for 2007, but development was discontinued in 2006 due to "poor test results".

== Pharmacology ==
=== Pharmacodynamics ===
Radafaxine is described as a norepinephrine–dopamine reuptake inhibitor (NDRI). In contrast to bupropion, it appears to have a higher potency on inhibition of norepinephrine reuptake than on dopamine reuptake. Radafaxine has about 70% of the efficacy of bupropion in blocking dopamine reuptake, and 392% of efficacy in blocking norepinephrine reuptake, making it fairly selective for inhibiting the reuptake of norepinephrine over dopamine. This, according to GlaxoSmithKline, may account for the increased effect of radafaxine on pain and fatigue. At least one study suggests that radafaxine has a low abuse potential similar to bupropion.

== Chemistry ==
Radafaxine is a potent metabolite of bupropion, the compound in GlaxoSmithKline's Wellbutrin. More specifically, hydroxybupropion is a major metabolite of bupropion that is further metabolized via an intramolecular cyclization to give radafaxine as the (2S,3S) isomer, as well as the corresponding (2R,3R) isomer isomer, which is less pharmacologically active as a monoamine reuptake inhibitor than radafaxine. Manifaxine (GW-320,659) was developed as an analogue of radafaxine and has been studied for the treatment of ADHD and obesity.

== See also ==
- Substituted cathinone
- Substituted phenylmorpholine
- List of investigational antidepressants
- (2R,3R)-Hydroxybupropion
- 3-Chlorophenmetrazine
- Manifaxine
