= CHRNA1 =

Protein-coding gene in humans

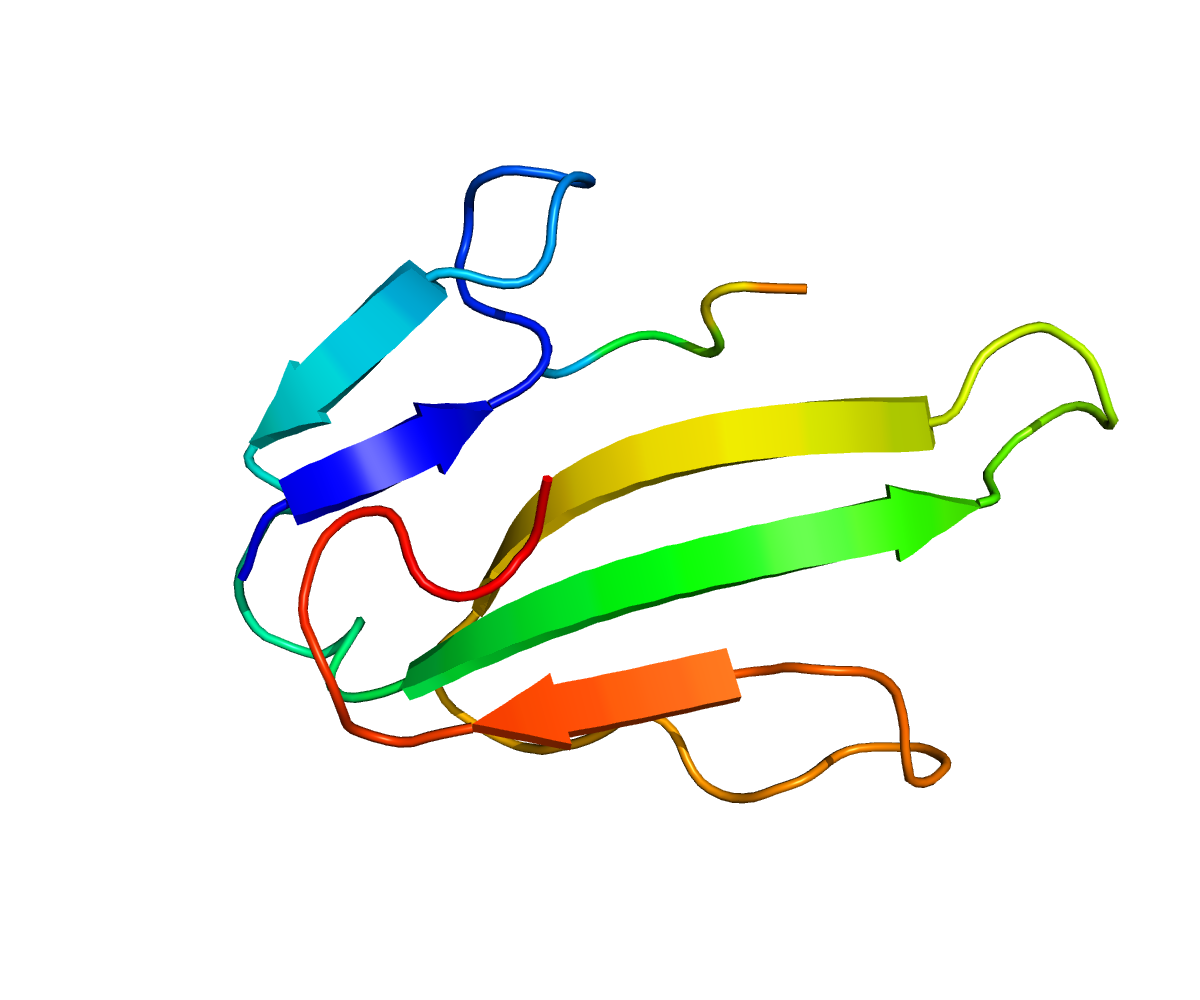

Identifiers
- Aliases: CHRNA1, ACHRA, ACHRD, CHRNA, CMS2A, FCCMS, SCCMS, CMS1A, CMS1B, Cholinergic receptor, nicotinic, alpha 1, cholinergic receptor nicotinic alpha 1 subunit
- External IDs: OMIM: 100690; MGI: 87885; GeneCards: CHRNA1
Available structures
PDB	Ortholog search: PDBe RCSB
PDB	List of PDB id codes 4ZJS

Gene location (Human)
Chr.	Chromosome 2 (human)
Band	2q31.1	Start	174,747,592 bp
Band	2q31.1	End	174,787,935 bp

Gene location (Mouse)
Chr.	Chromosome 2 (mouse)
Band	2 C3|2 43.76 cM	Start	73,393,559 bp
Band	2 C3|2 43.76 cM	End	73,410,682 bp
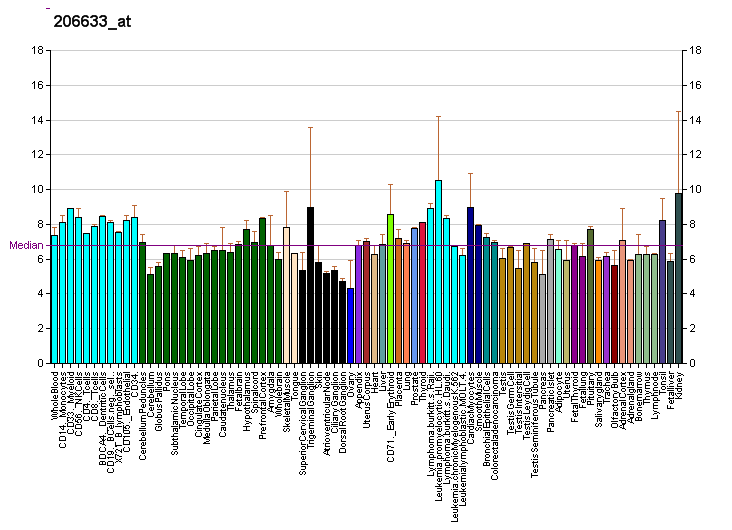
RNA expression pattern
Bgee	Human / Mouse (ortholog); Top expressed in: gastrocnemius muscle; glutes; tibialis anterior muscle; deltoid muscle; muscle of thigh; testicle; triceps brachii muscle; quadriceps femoris muscle; vastus lateralis muscle; Skeletal muscle tissue of biceps brachii / Top expressed in: ankle; extraocular muscle; ankle joint; internal carotid artery; soleus muscle; vastus lateralis muscle; temporal muscle; triceps brachii muscle; thoracic diaphragm; sternocleidomastoid muscle; More reference expression data
BioGPS	More reference expression data
Gene ontology
Molecular function	extracellular ligand-gated ion channel activity; acetylcholine receptor activity; ligand-gated ion channel activity; ion channel activity; acetylcholine binding; acetylcholine-gated cation-selective channel activity; transmembrane signaling receptor activity; transmitter-gated ion channel activity involved in regulation of postsynaptic membrane potential
Cellular component	integral component of membrane; membrane; synapse; cell junction; plasma membrane; neuromuscular junction; cell surface; postsynaptic membrane; acetylcholine-gated channel complex; integral component of postsynaptic specialization membrane; integral component of plasma membrane; neuron projection
Biological process	muscle cell cellular homeostasis; neuron cellular homeostasis; regulation of membrane potential; skeletal muscle contraction; response to nicotine; cation transport; synaptic transmission, cholinergic; ion transport; skeletal muscle tissue growth; neuromuscular synaptic transmission; neuromuscular process; neuromuscular junction development; musculoskeletal movement; signal transduction; neuronal action potential; regulation of postsynaptic membrane potential; excitatory postsynaptic potential; ion transmembrane transport; chemical synaptic transmission; nervous system process
Sources:Amigo / QuickGO
Orthologs
Databases	NCBI: entry; OMA: entry
Species	Human	Mouse
Entrez	1134	11435
Ensembl	ENSG00000138435	ENSMUSG00000027107
UniProt	P02708	P04756
RefSeq (mRNA)	NM_001039523; NM_000079	NM_007389
RefSeq (protein)	NP_000070; NP_001034612	NP_031415
Location (UCSC)	Chr 2: 174.75 – 174.79 Mb	Chr 2: 73.39 – 73.41 Mb
PubMed search
- Wikidata
View/Edit Human	View/Edit Mouse

Neuronal acetylcholine receptor subunit alpha-1, also known as nAChRα1, is a protein that in humans is encoded by the CHRNA1 gene. The protein encoded by this gene is a subunit of certain nicotinic acetylcholine receptors (nAChR).

The muscle acetylcholine receptor consists of 5 subunits of 4 different types: 2 alpha isoforms and 1 each of beta, gamma, delta and epsilon subunits. The gamma sub-unit being only present in embryonic nAChR. This gene encodes an alpha subunit that plays a role in acetylcholine binding/channel gating. Alternatively spliced transcript variants encoding different isoforms have been identified.

== Interactions ==
Neuronal acetylcholine receptor subunit alpha-1 has been shown to interact with CHRND.

== See also ==
- Nicotinic acetylcholine receptor
