= Carbonyl reductase (NADPH) =

Class of enzymes

carbonyl reductase (NADPH)
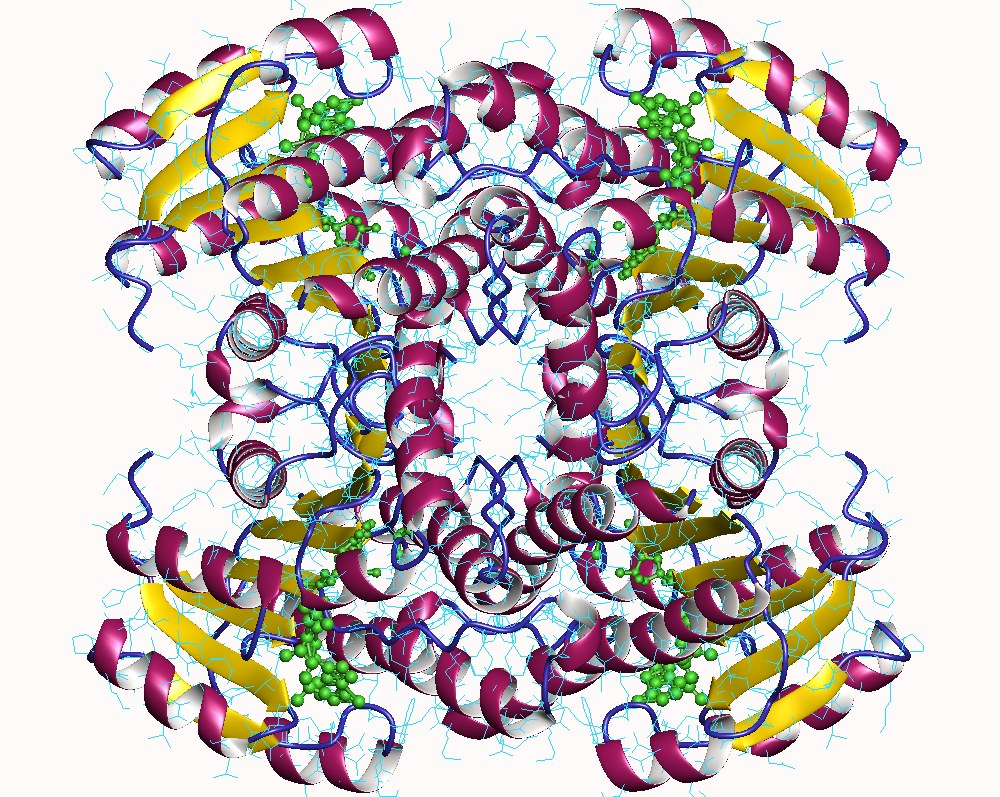
- carbonyl reductase tetramer, Mouse

Identifiers
- EC no.: 1.1.1.184
- CAS no.: 89700-36-7

Databases
- IntEnz: IntEnz view
- BRENDA: BRENDA entry
- ExPASy: NiceZyme view
- KEGG: KEGG entry
- MetaCyc: metabolic pathway
- PRIAM: profile
- PDB structures: RCSB PDB PDBe PDBsum
- Gene Ontology: AmiGO / QuickGO
Search
- PMC: articles
- PubMed: articles
- NCBI: proteins

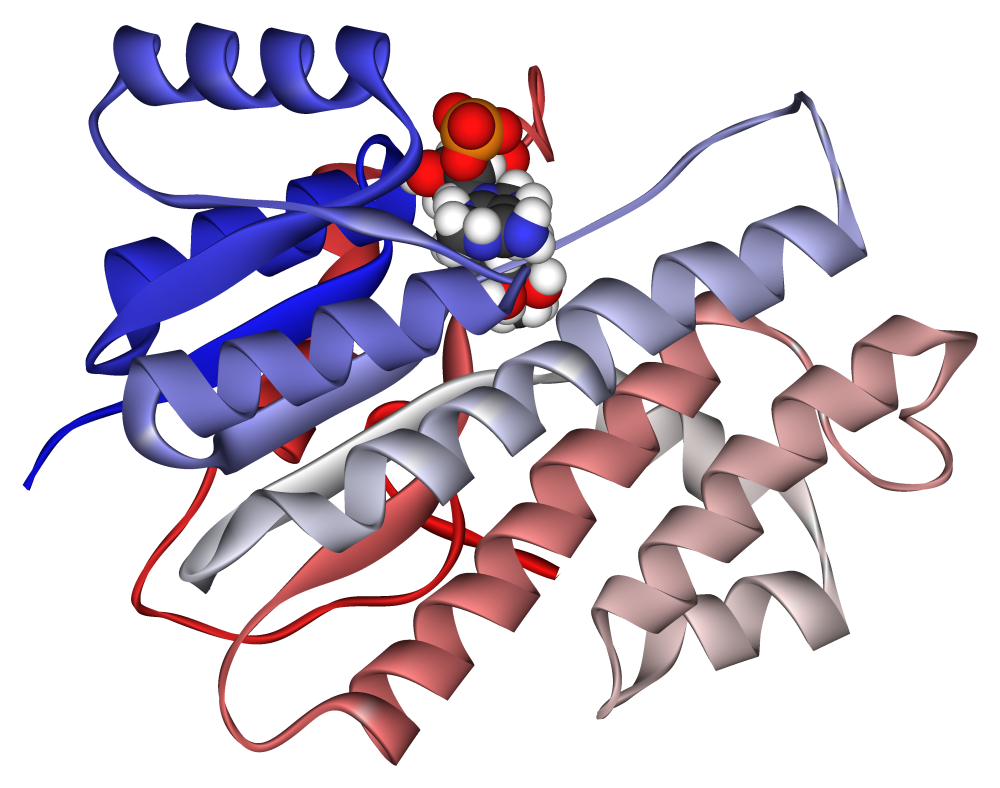
Ribbon diagram of human carbonyl reductase 1, in complex with NADPH and a small molecule inhibitor (not shown). From PDB: 1WMA.

In enzymology, a carbonyl reductase (NADPH) (EC 1.1.1.184) is an enzyme that catalyzes the chemical reaction

R-CO-R' + NADPH + H^{+} $\rightleftharpoons$ :R-CHOH-R' + NADP^{+}

Thus, the two products of this enzyme are R-CHOH-R' and NADP^{+}, whereas its 3 substrates are R-CO-R', NADPH, and H^{+}.

This enzyme belongs to the family of oxidoreductases, specifically those acting on the CH-OH group of donor with NAD^{+} or NADP^{+} as acceptor. The systematic name of this enzyme class is secondary-alcohol:NADP^{+} oxidoreductase. Other names in common use include aldehyde reductase 1, prostaglandin 9-ketoreductase, xenobiotic ketone reductase, NADPH-dependent carbonyl reductase, ALR3, carbonyl reductase, nonspecific NADPH-dependent carbonyl reductase, aldehyde reductase 1, and carbonyl reductase (NADPH). This enzyme participates in arachidonic acid metabolism, and has recently been shown to catabolize S-Nitrosoglutathione, as a means to degrade NO in an NADPH-dependent manner.

== Structural studies ==
As of late 2007, 4 structures have been solved for this class of enzymes, with PDB accession codes 1CYD, 1WMA, 2HRB, and 2PFG.
