= CYP2B6 =

Protein-coding gene in humans

Identifiers
- Aliases: CYP2B6, CPB6, CYP2B, CYP2B7, CYP2B7P, CYPIIB6, EFVM, IIB1, P450, cytochrome P450 family 2 subfamily B member 6, Cytochrome P450 2B6
- External IDs: OMIM: 123930; MGI: 88598; GeneCards: CYP2B6
Available structures
PDB	Ortholog search: PDBe RCSB
PDB	List of PDB id codes 3IBD, 3QOA, 3QU8, 3UA5, 4I91, 4RQL, 4RRT, 4ZV8

Gene location (Human)
Chr.	Chromosome 19 (human)
Band	19q13.2	Start	40,991,282 bp
Band	19q13.2	End	41,018,398 bp

Gene location (Mouse)
Chr.	Chromosome 7 (mouse)
Band	7 A3|7 14.11 cM	Start	25,597,045 bp
Band	7 A3|7 14.11 cM	End	25,626,049 bp
RNA expression pattern
Bgee	Human / Mouse (ortholog); Top expressed in: right lobe of liver; buccal mucosa cell; mucosa of paranasal sinus; nasal epithelium; kidney tubule; tendon of biceps brachii; mucosa of ileum; mucosa of transverse colon; olfactory zone of nasal mucosa; metanephric glomerulus / Top expressed in: right lung lobe; duodenum; lacrimal gland; parotid gland; submandibular gland; intestinal villus; skin of abdomen; Ileal epithelium; skin of external ear; jejunum; More reference expression data
BioGPS	n/a
Gene ontology
Molecular function	iron ion binding; arachidonic acid epoxygenase activity; oxidoreductase activity, acting on paired donors, with incorporation or reduction of molecular oxygen, reduced flavin or flavoprotein as one donor, and incorporation of one atom of oxygen; metal ion binding; heme binding; oxidoreductase activity, acting on paired donors, with incorporation or reduction of molecular oxygen; oxidoreductase activity; steroid hydroxylase activity; monooxygenase activity
Cellular component	organelle membrane; endoplasmic reticulum membrane; membrane; intracellular membrane-bounded organelle; endoplasmic reticulum; cytoplasm
Biological process	steroid metabolic process; epoxygenase P450 pathway; cellular ketone metabolic process; xenobiotic metabolic process; organic acid metabolic process
Sources:Amigo / QuickGO
Orthologs
Databases	NCBI: entry; OMA: entry
Species	Human	Mouse
Entrez	1555	13088
Ensembl	ENSG00000197408	ENSMUSG00000030483
UniProt	P20813	P12791
RefSeq (mRNA)	NM_000767	NM_009999
RefSeq (protein)	NP_000758	n/a
Location (UCSC)	Chr 19: 40.99 – 41.02 Mb	Chr 7: 25.6 – 25.63 Mb
PubMed search
- Wikidata
View/Edit Human	View/Edit Mouse

Cytochrome P450 2B6 is an enzyme that in humans is encoded by the CYP2B6 gene. CYP2B6 is a member of the cytochrome P450 group of enzymes. Along with CYP2A6, it is involved with metabolizing nicotine, along with many other substances.

== Function ==
This gene, CYP2B6, encodes a member of the cytochrome P450 superfamily of enzymes. The cytochrome P450 proteins are monooxygenases which catalyze many reactions involved in drug metabolism and synthesis of cholesterol, steroids and other lipids. This protein localizes to the endoplasmic reticulum and its expression is induced by phenobarbital. The enzyme is known to metabolize some xenobiotics, such as the anti-cancer drugs cyclophosphamide and ifosphamide.

== Gene ==
Transcript variants for this gene have been described; however, it has not been resolved whether these transcripts are in fact produced by this gene or by a closely related pseudogene, CYP2B7. Both the gene and the pseudogene are located in the middle of a CYP2A pseudogene found in a large cluster of cytochrome P450 genes from the CYP2A, CYP2B and CYP2F subfamilies on chromosome 19q.

== CYP2B6 ligands ==
Following is a table of selected substrates, inducers and inhibitors of CYP2B6.

Inhibitors of CYP2B6 can be classified by their potency, such as:

- Strong inhibitor being one that causes at least a 5-fold increase in the plasma AUC values, or more than 80% decrease in clearance.
- Moderate inhibitor being one that causes at least a 2-fold increase in the plasma AUC values, or 50–80% decrease in clearance.
- Weak inhibitor being one that causes at least a 1.25-fold but less than 2-fold increase in the plasma AUC values, or 20–50% decrease in clearance.

Substrates	Inhibitors	Inducers
alfentanil (opioid analgesic); bupropion (antidepressant); clopidogrel; cyclophosphamide (alkylating antineoplastic agent); efavirenz (NNRTI); ifosfamide (alkylating antineoplastic agent); ketamine (dissociative anaesthetic); methadone (opiate replacement therapy); methoxetamine (dissociative agent, NMDA receptor antagonist); nevirapine (NNRTI); propofol (anesthetic); selegiline; sertraline (antidepressant); sorafenib (protein kinase inhibitor); tamoxifen (SERM); valproic acid (anticonvulsant); verapamil (minor/moderate sensitive substrates)	Strong: orphenadrine (anticholinergic); Artemisia annua; Moderate: selegiline; Unspecified potency: chlorpyrifos (insecticide); clopidogrel (antiplatelet); clotrimazole (antifungal); curcumin (supplement) (constituent of turmeric); ethinylestradiol (estrogen, contraceptive); fluoxetine (antidepressant); fluvoxamine (antidepressant); itraconazole (antifungal); ketoconazole (antifungal); memantine (NMDA antagonist); paroxetine (antidepressant); raloxifene (SERM); sertraline (antidepressant); thiotepa (anticancer); ticlopidine (antiplatelet)	carbamazepine (anticonvulsant, mood stabilizer); phenobarbital (anticonvulsant); phenytoin (antiepileptic); rifampicin (bactericidal); efavirenz (virostatic)
