= Dibenzocycloheptene =

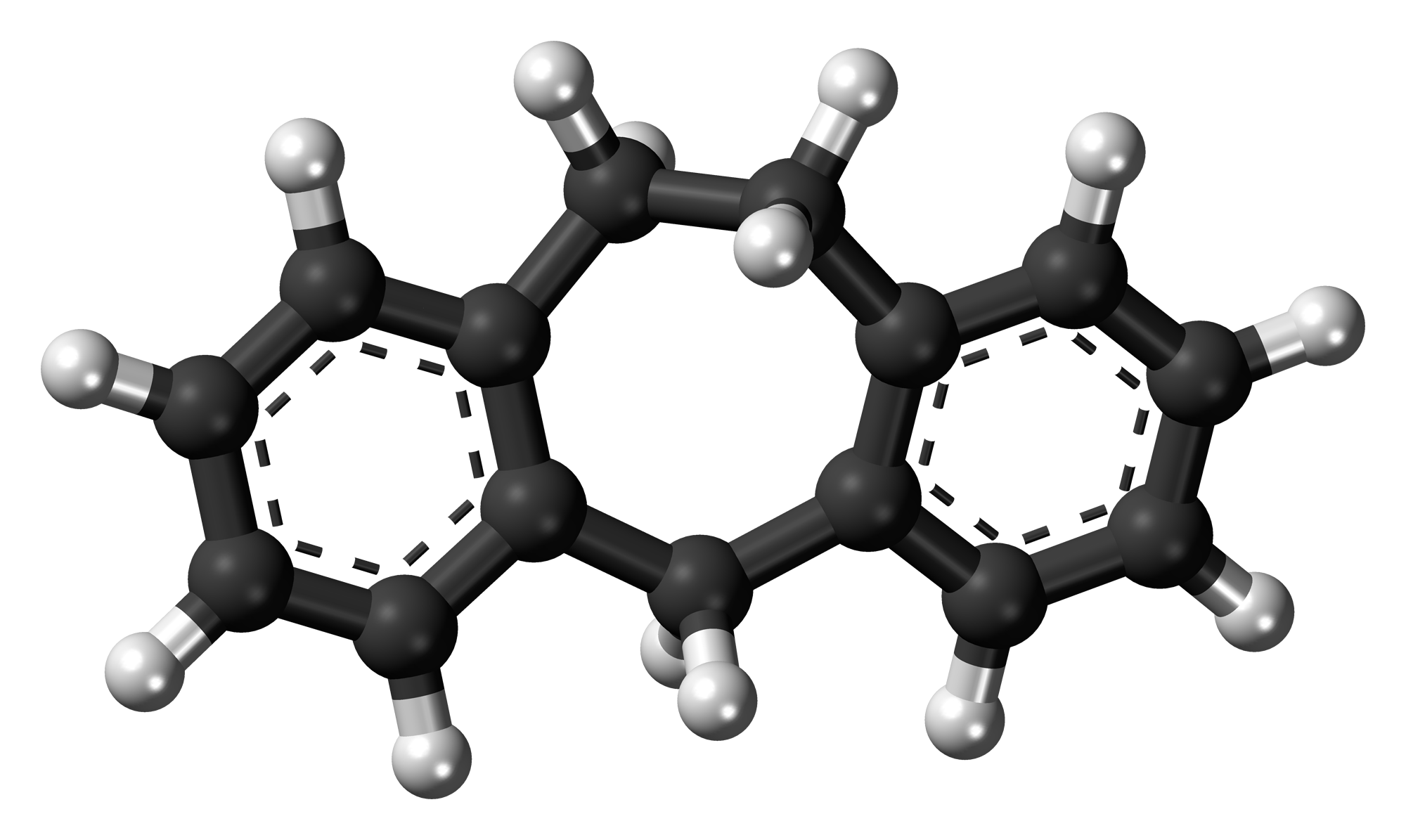

Names
- Preferred IUPAC name 10,11-Dihydro-5H-dibenzo[a,d][7]annulene
- Other names 10,11-dihydro-5H-dibenzo[a,d]cycloheptene

Identifiers
CAS Number	833-48-7
3D model (JSmol)	Interactive image
ChemSpider	63219
ECHA InfoCard	100.011.482
PubChem CID	70029
UNII	GU7KLN5ED5
CompTox Dashboard (EPA)	DTXSID10232254
- InChI: InChI=1S/C15H14/c1-3-7-14-11-15-8-4-2-6-13(15)10-9-12(14)5-1/h1-8H,9-11H2
- SMILES: c1cc3c(cc1)Cc2c(cccc2)CC3

Properties
Chemical formula	C_{15}H_{14}
Molar mass	194.277 g·mol^{−1}
- Except where otherwise noted, data are given for materials in their standard state (at 25 °C [77 °F], 100 kPa). Infobox references

Dibenzocycloheptene (also known as dibenzosuberane and dibenzocycloheptadiene) is a tricyclic chemical compound featuring two benzene rings bound to a cycloheptene group. It is an occasional motif in synthetic organic chemistry. Various tricyclic antidepressants (TCAs) contain the dibenzocycloheptene moiety in their chemical structures, including amineptine, amitriptyline, amitriptylinoxide, butriptyline, demexiptiline, nortriptyline, noxiptiline, and protriptyline. Cyclobenzaprine, a skeletal muscle relaxant, also contains this functional group.

== Numbering system ==
Dibenzocycloheptene numbering system

== See also ==
- Dibenzazepine
- Dibenzothiepin
- Dibenzoxepin
- Dibenzothiazepine
