= Dibenzoxepin =

Names
- Preferred IUPAC name Dibenzo[b,e]oxepine
- Other names Dibenz[b,e]oxepin; 9-oxatricyclo[9.4.0.0^{3,8}]pentadeca-1,3,5,7,10,12,14-heptaene

Identifiers
CAS Number	256-87-1
3D model (JSmol)	Interactive image
ChemSpider	11273007
PubChem CID	20373272
UNII	N7JJ2DFK5F
CompTox Dashboard (EPA)	DTXSID501337203
- InChI: InChI=1S/C14H10O/c1-2-7-13-10-15-14-8-4-3-6-12(14)9-11(13)5-1/h1-10H Key: APMCUORPNXHBQK-UHFFFAOYSA-N
- SMILES: C1=CC=C2C(=C1)C=C3C=CC=CC3=CO2

Properties
Chemical formula	C_{14}H_{10}O
Molar mass	194.233 g·mol^{−1}
- Except where otherwise noted, data are given for materials in their standard state (at 25 °C [77 °F], 100 kPa). Infobox references

Dibenzoxepin, or dibenz[b,e]oxepin, is a tricyclic compound. It is the parent structure of certain drugs such as the tricyclic antidepressant doxepin and the analgesic fluradoline. The former is the only tricyclic antidepressant that is a dibenzoxepin.

== See also ==
- Dibenzazepine
- Dibenzocycloheptene
- Dibenzothiepin
- Dibenzothiazepine
