= Quinupramine =

Tricyclic antidepressant

Clinical data
- Routes of administration: Oral
- ATC code: N06AA23 (WHO)

Legal status
- Legal status: In general: ℞ (Prescription only)

Pharmacokinetic data
- Elimination half-life: 33 hours

Identifiers
- IUPAC name: (±)-11-quinuclidin-3-yl-5,6-dihydrobenzo[b][1]benzazepine
- CAS Number: 31721-17-2
- PubChem CID: 93154
- ChemSpider: 84098
- UNII: 29O61HFF4L
- KEGG: D07336
- CompTox Dashboard (EPA): DTXSID70865608
- ECHA InfoCard: 100.046.149

Chemical and physical data
- Formula: C_{21}H_{24}N_{2}
- Molar mass: 304.437 g·mol^{−1}

Quinupramine (brand names Kevopril, Kinupril, Adeprim, Quinuprine) is a tricyclic antidepressant (TCA) used in Europe for the treatment of depression.

Pharmacologically, quinupramine acts in vitro as a strong muscarinic acetylcholine receptor antagonist (anticholinergic) and H_{1} receptor antagonist (antihistamine), moderate 5-HT_{2} receptor antagonist, and weak serotonin and norepinephrine reuptake inhibitor. It has negligible affinity for the α_{1}-adrenergic, α_{2}-adrenergic, β-adrenergic, or D_{2} receptor.

Clinically, quinupramine is reported to be stimulating similarly to imipramine, desipramine, and demexiptiline. It can be inferred that its in vivo metabolites may have stronger effects on the reuptake of norepinephrine and/or serotonin than quinupramine itself.
