= Nortriptyline =

Antidepressant medication

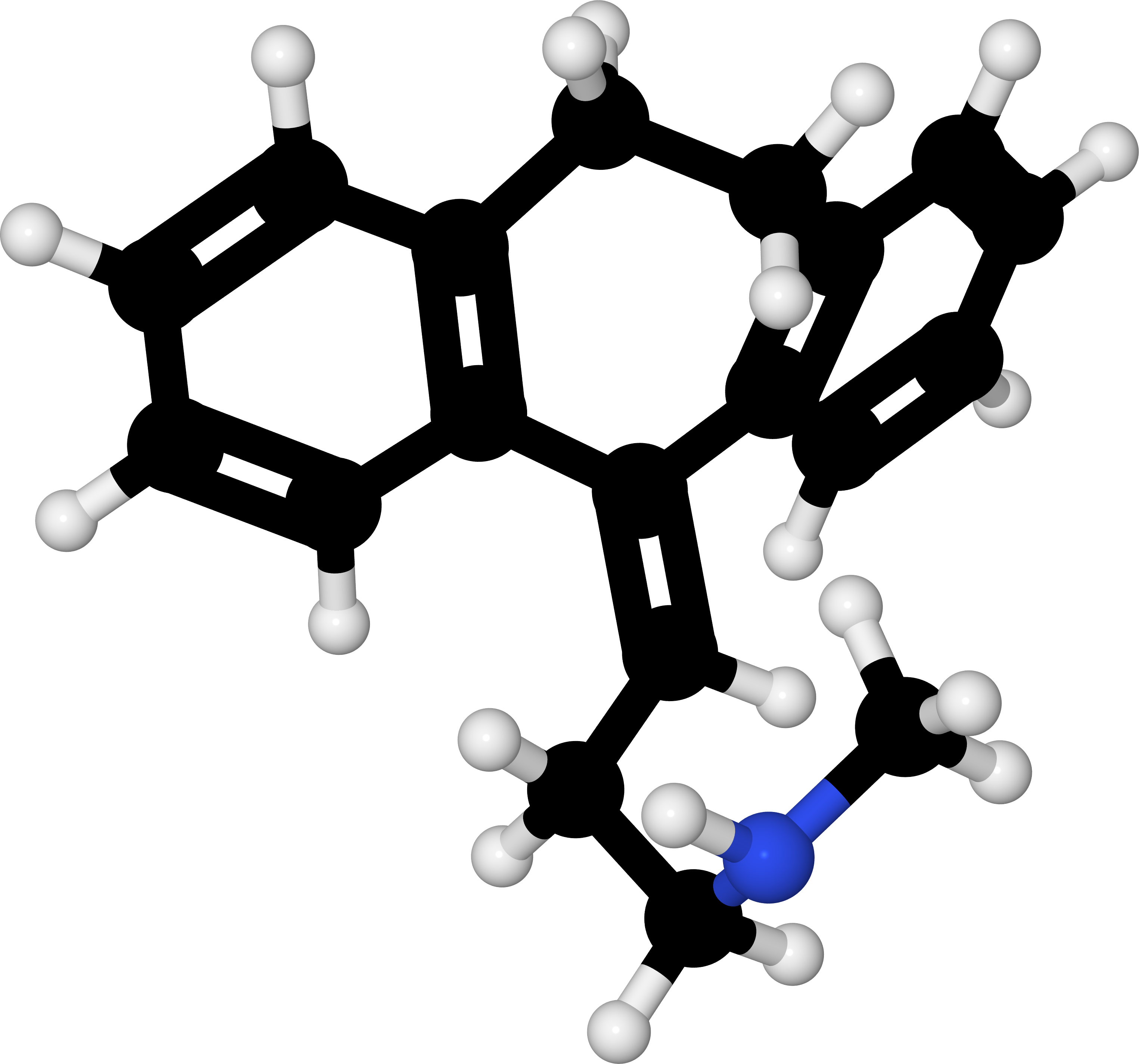

Clinical data
- Trade names: Aventyl, Pamelor, others
- Other names: Desitriptyline; ELF-101; E.L.F. 101; N-7048
- AHFS/Drugs.com: Monograph
- MedlinePlus: a682620
- License data: US DailyMed: Nortriptyline
- Pregnancy category: AU: C
- Routes of administration: By mouth
- Drug class: Tricyclic antidepressant (TCA)
- ATC code: N06AA10 (WHO)

Legal status
- Legal status: AU: S4 (Prescription only); BR: Class C1 (Other controlled substances); CA: ℞-only; US: ℞-only

Pharmacokinetic data
- Bioavailability: 32–79%
- Protein binding: 92%
- Metabolism: Liver
- Metabolites: 10-E-Hydroxynortriptyline
- Elimination half-life: 18–44 hours (mean 30 hours)
- Excretion: Urine: 40% Feces: minor

Identifiers
- IUPAC name: 3-(10,11-Dihydro-5H-dibenzo[a,d]cyclohepten-5-ylidene)-N-methyl-1-propanamine
- CAS Number: 72-69-5; 894-71-3
- PubChem CID: 4543
- IUPHAR/BPS: 2404
- DrugBank: DB00540
- ChemSpider: 4384
- UNII: BL03SY4LXB
- KEGG: D08288
- ChEBI: CHEBI:7640
- ChEMBL: ChEMBL445
- CompTox Dashboard (EPA): DTXSID9023384
- ECHA InfoCard: 100.000.717

Chemical and physical data
- Formula: C_{19}H_{21}N
- Molar mass: 263.384 g·mol^{−1}
- 3D model (JSmol): Interactive image
- SMILES: c3cc2c(/C(c1c(cccc1)CC2)=C/CCNC)cc3
- InChI: InChI=1S/C19H21N/c1-20-14-6-11-19-17-9-4-2-7-15(17)12-13-16-8-3-5-10-18(16)19/h2-5,7-11,20H,6,12-14H2,1H3; Key:PHVGLTMQBUFIQQ-UHFFFAOYSA-N

Nortriptyline, sold under the brand name Aventyl, among others, is a tricyclic antidepressant. This medicine is also sometimes used for neuropathic pain, attention deficit hyperactivity disorder (ADHD), smoking cessation and anxiety. Its use for young people with depression and other psychiatric disorders may be limited due to increased suicidality in the 18–24 population initiating treatment. Nortriptyline is not a preferred treatment for attention deficit hyperactivity disorder or smoking cessation. It is taken by mouth.

Common side effects include dry mouth, constipation, blurry vision, sleepiness, low blood pressure with standing, and weakness. Serious side effects may include seizures, an increased risk of suicide in those less than 25 years of age, urinary retention, glaucoma, mania, and a number of heart issues. Nortriptyline may cause problems if taken during pregnancy. Use during breastfeeding appears to be relatively safe. It is a tricyclic antidepressant (TCA) and is believed to work by altering levels of serotonin and norepinephrine.

Nortriptyline was approved for medical use in the United States in 1964. It is available as a generic medication. In 2023, it was the 204th most commonly prescribed medication in the United States, with more than 2 million prescriptions.

== Medical uses ==
Nortriptyline is used to treat depression. A level between 50 and 150 ng/mL of nortriptyline in the blood generally corresponds with an antidepressant effect.

It is also used off-label for the treatment of panic disorder, ADHD, irritable bowel syndrome, tobacco-cessation, migraine prophylaxis and chronic pain or neuralgia modification, particularly temporomandibular joint disorder.

== Contraindications ==
Nortriptyline should not be used in the acute recovery phase after myocardial infarction (heart attack). Use of tricyclic antidepressants along with a monoamine oxidase inhibitor (MAOI), linezolid, or IV methylene blue are contraindicated as it can cause an increased risk of developing serotonin syndrome.

Closer monitoring is required for those with a history of cardiovascular disease, stroke, glaucoma, or seizures, as well as in persons with hyperthyroidism or receiving thyroid hormones.

== Side effects ==
The most common side effects include dry mouth, sedation, constipation, increased appetite, blurred vision and tinnitus. An occasional side effect is a rapid or irregular heartbeat. Alcohol may exacerbate some of its side effects.

== Overdose ==
The symptoms and the treatment of an overdose are generally the same as for the other tricyclic antidepressants, including anticholinergic effects, serotonin syndrome and adverse cardiac effects. TCAs, particularly nortriptyline, have a relatively narrow therapeutic index, which increase the chance of an overdose (both accidental and intentional). Symptoms of overdose include: irregular heartbeat, seizures, coma, confusion, hallucination, widened pupils, drowsiness, agitation, fever, low body temperature, stiff muscles and vomiting.

== Interactions ==
Excessive consumption of alcohol in combination with nortriptyline therapy may have a potentiating effect, which may lead to the danger of increased suicidal attempts or overdosage, especially in patients with histories of emotional disturbances or suicidal ideation.

It may interact with the following drugs:

- heart rhythm medications such as flecainide (Tambocor), propafenone (Rhythmol), or quinidine (Cardioquin, Quinidex, Quinaglute)
- cimetidine
- guanethidine
- reserpine

== Pharmacology ==
Nortriptyline is a strong norepinephrine reuptake inhibitor and a moderate serotonin reuptake inhibitor. Additionally, nortriptyline inhibits the activity of histamine and acetylcholine. Its pharmacologic profile is as the table shows with (inhibition or antagonism of all sites).

=== Pharmacodynamics ===
Nortriptyline
Site	K_{i} (nM)	Species	Ref
SERT	15–18	Human	
NET	1.8–4.4	Human	
DAT	1,140	Human	
5-HT_{1A}	294	Human	
5-HT_{2A}	5.0–41	Human/rat	
5-HT_{2C}	8.5	Rat	
5-HT_{3}	1,400	Rat	
5-HT_{6}	148	Rat	
α_{1}	55	Human	
α_{2}	2,030	Human	
β	>10,000	Rat	
D_{2}	2,570	Human	
H_{1}	3.0–15	Human	
H_{2}	646	Human	
H_{3}	45,700	Human	
H_{4}	6,920	Human	
mACh	37	Human	
M_{1}	40	Human	
M_{2}	110	Human	
M_{3}	50	Human	
M_{4}	84	Human	
M_{5}	97	Human	
σ_{1}	2,000	Guinea pig	
Values are K_{i} (nM). The smaller the value, the more strongly the drug binds to the site.

Nortriptyline is an active metabolite of amitriptyline by demethylation in the liver. Chemically, it is a secondary amine dibenzocycloheptene and pharmacologically it is classed as a first-generation antidepressant.

Nortriptyline may also have a sleep-improving effect due to antagonism of the H_{1} and 5-HT_{2A} receptors. In the short term, however, nortriptyline may disturb sleep due to its activating effect.

In one study, nortriptyline had the highest affinity for the dopamine transporter among the tricyclic antidepressants (K_{D} = 1,140 nM) besides amineptine (a norepinephrine–dopamine reuptake inhibitor), although its affinity for this transporter was still 261- and 63-fold lower than for the norepinephrine and serotonin transporters (K_{D} = 4.37 and 18 nM, respectively).

=== Pharmacogenetics ===
Nortriptyline is metabolized in the liver by the hepatic enzyme CYP2D6, and genetic variations within the gene coding for this enzyme can affect its metabolism, leading to changes in the concentrations of the drug in the body. Increased concentrations of nortriptyline may increase the risk for side effects, including anticholinergic and nervous system adverse effects, while decreased concentrations may reduce the drug's efficacy.

Individuals can be categorized into different types of CYP2D6 metabolizers depending on which genetic variations they carry. These metabolizer types include poor, intermediate, extensive, and ultrarapid metabolizers. Most individuals (about 77–92%) are extensive metabolizers, and have "normal" metabolism of nortriptyline. Poor and intermediate metabolizers have reduced metabolism of the drug as compared to extensive metabolizers; patients with these metabolizer types may have an increased probability of experiencing side effects. Ultrarapid metabolizers use nortriptyline much faster than extensive metabolizers; patients with this metabolizer type may have a greater chance of experiencing pharmacological failure.

The Clinical Pharmacogenetics Implementation Consortium recommends avoiding nortriptyline in persons who are CYP2D6 ultrarapid or poor metabolizers, due to the risk of a lack of efficacy and side effects, respectively. A reduction in starting dose is recommended for patients who are CYP2D6 intermediate metabolizers. If use of nortriptyline is warranted, therapeutic drug monitoring is recommended to guide dose adjustments. The Dutch Pharmacogenetics Working Group recommends reducing the dose of nortriptyline in CYP2D6 poor or intermediate metabolizers, and selecting an alternative drug or increasing the dose in ultrarapid metabolizers.

== Chemistry ==
Nortriptyline is a tricyclic compound, specifically a dibenzocycloheptadiene, and possesses three rings fused together with a side chain attached in its chemical structure. Other dibenzocycloheptadiene tricyclic antidepressants include amitriptyline (N-methylnortriptyline), protriptyline, and butriptyline. Nortriptyline is a secondary amine tricyclic antidepressant, with its N-methylated parent amitriptyline being a tertiary amine. Other secondary amine tricyclic antidepressants include desipramine and protriptyline. The chemical name of nortriptyline is 3-(10,11-dihydro-5H-dibenzo[a,d]cyclohepten-5-ylidene)-N-methyl-1-propanamine and its free base form has a chemical formula of C_{19}H_{21}N_{1} with a molecular weight of 263.384 g/mol. The drug is used commercially mostly as the hydrochloride salt; the free base form is used rarely. The CAS Registry Number of the free base is 72-69-5 and of the hydrochloride is 894-71-3.

== History ==
Nortriptyline was developed by Geigy. It first appeared in the literature in 1962 and was patented the same year. The drug was first introduced for the treatment of depression in 1963.

== Society and culture ==
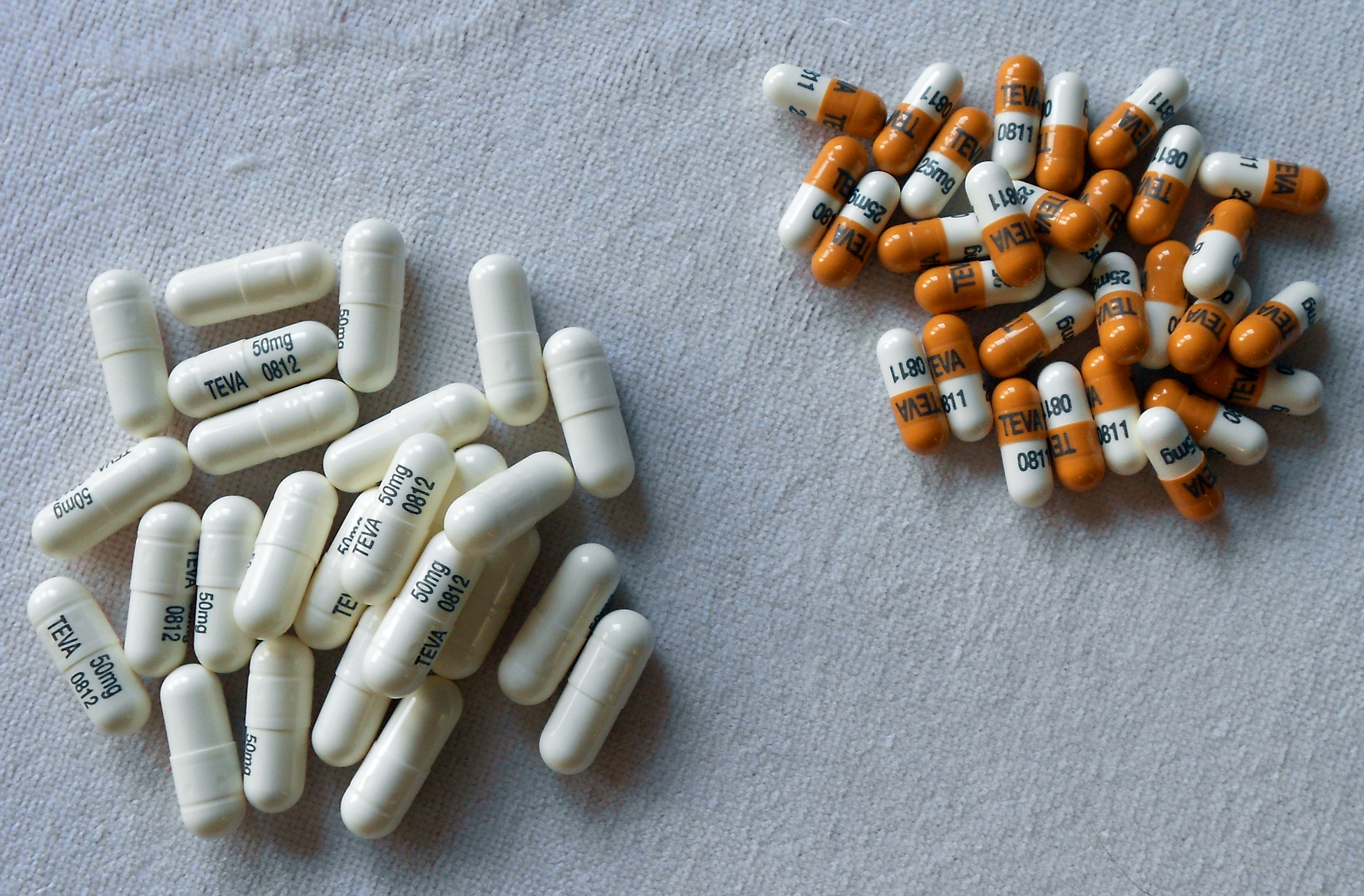
50 mg (left) and 25 mg generic nortriptyline HCl capsules made by Teva Pharmaceutical Industries

=== Generic names ===
Nortriptyline is the generic name of the drug and its INN, BAN, and DCF, while nortriptyline hydrochloride is its USAN, USP, BANM, and JAN. Its generic name in Spanish and Italian and its DCIT are nortriptilina, in German is nortriptylin, and in Latin is nortriptylinum.

=== Brand names ===
Brand names of nortriptyline include Allegron, Aventyl, Noritren, Norpress, Nortrilen, Norventyl, Norzepine, Pamelor, and Sensival, among many others.

== Research ==
Although not approved by the US Food and Drug Administration (FDA) for neuropathic pain, randomized controlled trials have demonstrated the effectiveness of tricyclic antidepressants for the treatment of this condition in both depressed and non-depressed individuals. In 2010, an evidence-based guideline sponsored by the International Association for the Study of Pain recommended nortriptyline as a first-line medication for neuropathic pain. However, in a 2015 Cochrane systematic review the authors did not recommend nortriptyline as a first-line agent for neuropathic pain.

It may be effective in the treatment of tobacco-cessation.
