= Tricyclic antidepressant =

Class of medications

- Drug class
- Chemical structure of the prototypical and first marketed tricyclic antidepressant imipramine showing its three rings.

Class identifiers
- Chemical class: Tricyclic

External links
- MeSH: D000929

Legal status

Tricyclic antidepressants (TCAs) are a class of medications that are used primarily as antidepressants. TCAs were discovered in the early 1950s and were marketed later in the decade. They are named after their chemical structure, which contains three rings of atoms. Tetracyclic antidepressants (TeCAs), which contain four rings of atoms, are a closely related group of antidepressant compounds.

Although TCAs are sometimes prescribed for depressive disorders, they have been largely replaced in clinical use in most parts of the world by newer antidepressants such as selective serotonin reuptake inhibitors (SSRIs), serotonin–norepinephrine reuptake inhibitors (SNRIs) and norepinephrine reuptake inhibitors (NRIs).

== Medical uses ==
The TCAs are used primarily in the clinical treatment of mood disorders such as major depressive disorder (MDD), dysthymia, and treatment-resistant variants. They are also used in the treatment of a number of other medical disorders, including cyclic vomiting syndrome (CVS) and anxiety disorders such as generalized anxiety disorder (GAD), social anxiety disorder (SAD) and panic disorder, stress-related disorders such as adjustment disorder and post-traumatic stress disorder (PTSD), obsessive–compulsive Disorder (OCD) as well as other obsessive–compulsive-related disorders such as trichotillomania and body dysmorphic disorder (BDD), eating disorders like anorexia nervosa and bulimia nervosa, certain personality disorders such as borderline personality disorder (BPD) and avoidant personality disorder (AvPD), neurodevelopmental disorders such as attention deficit hyperactivity disorder (ADHD) autism spectrum disorder (ASD), and Tourette syndrome, neurological disorders such as Parkinson's disease, as well as chronic pain, neuralgia or neuropathic pain, trigeminal neuralgia, complex regional pain syndrome (CRPS), functional neurological symptom disorder, and fibromyalgia, headache or migraine, smoking cessation, irritable bowel syndrome (IBS), interstitial cystitis, nocturnal enuresis, sleep–wake disorders such as narcolepsy, insomnia, and rapid eye movement sleep behavior disorder, as well as emotional lability, chronic hiccups, ciguatera poisoning, as well as certain types of dissociative symptoms such as depersonalization-derealization disorder, and as an adjunct for certain psychotic disorders, such as schizophrenia and schizoaffective disorder.

Nortriptyline and desipramine may be preferred medications over other TCAs among older adults due to their reduced anticholinergic effects, diminished cardiac toxicity, and more linear pharmacokinetics.

=== Clinical depression ===
For many years the TCAs were the first choice for pharmacological treatment of major depression. Although they are still considered to be effective, they have been increasingly replaced by antidepressants with an improved safety and side-effect profile, such as the SSRIs and other newer antidepressants such as the novel reversible MAOI moclobemide. However, TCAs have been claimed to possibly be more effective in treating melancholic depression than other antidepressant drug classes. Newer antidepressants are thought to have fewer and less severe side effects and are also thought to be less likely to result in injury or death if used in a suicide attempt, as the doses required for clinical treatment and potentially lethal overdose (see therapeutic index) are far wider in comparison.

Nonetheless, the TCAs are commonly prescribed for treatment-resistant depression that has failed to respond to therapy with newer antidepressants, they also tend to have fewer emotional blunting and sexual side effects than SSRI antidepressants. They are not considered addictive and are somewhat preferable to the monoamine oxidase inhibitors (MAOIs). The side effects of the TCAs usually come to prominence before the therapeutic benefits against depression and/or anxiety do, and for this reason, they may potentially be somewhat dangerous, as volition can be increased, possibly giving the patient a greater desire to attempt or commit suicide.

A 2024 systematic review and meta-analysis assessed the beneficial and harmful effects of TCAs in the treatment of major depressive disorder in adults. Previous systematic reviews and meta-analyses had not comprehensively assessed TCAs in the same fashion, with the largest including only two TCAs (amitriptyline and clomipramine) and only 36 trials. A total of 103 short-term clinical trials with 10,590 participants employing 12 different TCAs (and TeCAs) were included. TCAs showed a small benefit on depression over that of placebo in terms of reduction in Hamilton Depression Rating Scale-17 (HDRS-17) scores (mean difference: –3.77 points; or with removal of an outlier study: –3.16 points). Due to the possibility of unblinding by side effects, it was unclear whether TCAs had a genuine antidepressant effect or whether the benefits were merely due to amplified placebo effects. TCAs had a higher rate of serious adverse effects than placebo, and this did reach statistical significance (OR = 2.78; 95% CI: 2.18–3.55; k = 35). However, trial sequential analysis indicated that the required information size had not been reached to conclusively confirm this effect. The quality of evidence was low to very low and the results were at high risk of bias. Among the collaborators of the systematic review and meta-analysis included Irving Kirsch, Joanna Moncrieff, and Michael P. Hengartner.

=== Attention deficit hyperactivity disorder ===
The TCAs were used in the past in the clinical treatment of ADHD, though they are not typically used anymore, having been replaced by more effective agents with fewer side effects such as atomoxetine (Strattera, Tomoxetin) and stimulants like methylphenidate (Ritalin, Focalin, Concerta), and amphetamine (Adderall, Attentin, Dexedrine, Vyvanse). ADHD is thought to be caused by an insufficiency of dopamine and norepinephrine activity in the prefrontal cortex of the brain. Most of the TCAs inhibit the reuptake of norepinephrine, though not dopamine, and as a result, they show some efficacy in remedying the disorder. Notably, the TCAs are more effective in treating the behavioral aspects of ADHD than the cognitive deficits, as they help limit hyperactivity and impulsivity, but have little to no benefits on attention.

=== Chronic pain ===
The TCAs show efficacy in the clinical treatment of a number of different types of chronic pain, notably neuralgia or neuropathic pain and fibromyalgia. The precise mechanism of action in explanation of their analgesic efficacy is unclear, but it is thought that they indirectly modulate the opioid system in the brain downstream via serotonergic and noradrenergic neuromodulation, among other properties. They are also effective in migraine prophylaxis, though not in the instant relief of an acute migraine attack. They may also be effective to prevent chronic tension headaches. Tricyclic antidepressant are supposed to have effect on reducing mast cell degranulation, thus reducing pain and the symptoms associated with mast cell activation, such as IBS pain; people with IBS exhibit increased mucosal mast cells, elevated tryptase/histamine, and enhanced proximity of degranulating mast cells to enteric nerves, each correlating with subjective pain scores. The ability of tricyclic antidepressants that have mast-cell stabilizing effects (such as amitriptyline) to reduce subjective pain score are believed to help not simply by altering mood, but by reducing visceral afferent firing, possibly through attenuation of nerve-mast cell crosstalk.

== Side effects ==
Many side effects may be related to the antimuscarinic properties of the TCAs. Such side effects are relatively common and may include dry mouth, dry nose, blurry vision, lowered gastrointestinal motility or constipation, urinary retention, cognitive and/or memory impairment, and increased body temperature.

Other side effects may include drowsiness, anxiety, emotional blunting (apathy/anhedonia), confusion, restlessness, dizziness, akathisia, hypersensitivity, changes in appetite and weight, sweating, muscle twitches, weakness, nausea and vomiting, hypotension, tachycardia, and rarely, irregular heart rhythms. Twitching, hallucinations, delirium and coma are also some of the toxic effects caused by overdose. Rhabdomyolysis or muscle breakdown has been rarely reported with this class of drugs as well.

Delayed ejaculation may be experienced by some tricyclic antidepressants such as clomipramine.

Tolerance to these adverse effects of these drugs often develops if treatment is continued. Side effects may also be less troublesome if treatment is initiated with low doses and then gradually increased, although this may also delay the beneficial effects.

TCAs can behave like class 1A antiarrhythmics, as such, they can theoretically terminate ventricular fibrillation, decrease cardiac contractility and increase collateral blood circulation to ischemic heart muscle. Naturally, in overdose, they can be cardiotoxic, prolonging heart rhythms and increasing myocardial irritability.

New research has also revealed compelling evidence of a link between long-term use of anticholinergic medications like TCAs and dementia. Although many studies have investigated this link, this was the first study to use a long-term approach (over seven years) to find that dementias associated with anticholinergics may not be reversible even years after drug use stops. Anticholinergic drugs block the action of acetylcholine, which transmits messages in the nervous system. In the brain, acetylcholine is involved in learning and memory.

=== Withdrawal ===
Antidepressants in general may produce withdrawal. However, since the term "withdrawal" has been linked to addiction to recreational drugs like opioids, the medical profession and pharmaceutical public relations prefer that a different term be used, hence "discontinuation syndrome". Discontinuation symptoms can be managed by a gradual reduction in dosage over a period of weeks or months to minimise symptoms. In tricyclics, discontinuation syndrome symptoms include anxiety, insomnia, cholinergic rebound, headache, nausea, malaise, or motor disturbance.

== Overdose ==
TCA overdose is a significant cause of fatal drug poisoning. The severe morbidity and mortality associated with these drugs is well documented due to their cardiovascular and neurological toxicity. Additionally, it is a serious problem in the pediatric population due to their inherent toxicity and the availability of these in the home when prescribed for bed-wetting and depression. In the event of a known or suspected overdose, medical assistance should be sought immediately.

A number of treatments are effective in a TCA overdose.

An overdose on TCA is especially fatal as it is rapidly absorbed from the GI tract in the alkaline conditions of the small intestines. As a result, toxicity often becomes apparent in the first hour after an overdose. However, symptoms may take several hours to appear if a mixed overdose has caused delayed gastric emptying.

Many of the initial signs are those associated to the anticholinergic effects of TCAs such as dry mouth, blurred vision, urinary retention, constipation, dizziness, and emesis (or vomiting). Due to the location of norepinephrine receptors all over the body, many physical signs are also associated with a TCA overdose:

1. Anticholinergic effects: altered mental status (e.g., agitation, confusion, lethargy, etc.), resting sinus tachycardia, dry mouth, mydriasis, blurred vision, fever
2. Cardiac effects: hypertension (early and transient, should not be treated), tachycardia, orthostasis and hypotension, arrhythmias (including ventricular tachycardia and ventricular fibrillation, most serious consequence), ECG changes (prolonged QRS, QT, and PR intervals)
3. CNS effects: syncope, seizure, coma, myoclonus, hyperreflexia, convulsions, drowsiness
4. Pulmonary effects: hypoventilation resulting from CNS depression
5. Gastrointestinal effects: decreased or absent bowel sounds, constipation

Treatment of TCA overdose depends on severity of symptoms:

Initially, gastric decontamination of the patient is achieved by administering, either orally or via a nasogastric tube, activated charcoal pre-mixed with water, which adsorbs the drug in the gastrointestinal tract (most useful if given within 2 hours of drug ingestion). Other decontamination methods such as stomach pumps, gastric lavage, whole bowel irrigation, or (ipecac induced) emesis, are not recommended in TCA poisoning.

If there is metabolic acidosis, intravenous infusion of sodium bicarbonate is recommended by Toxbase.org, the UK and Ireland poisons advice database (TCAs are protein bound and become less bound in more acidic conditions, so by reversing the acidosis, protein binding increases and bioavailability thus decreases – the sodium load may also help to reverse the Na+ channel blocking effects of the TCA).

== Interactions ==
The TCAs are highly metabolised by the cytochrome P450 (CYP) hepatic enzymes. Drugs that inhibit cytochrome P450 (for example cimetidine, methylphenidate, fluoxetine, antipsychotics, and calcium channel blockers) may produce decreases in the TCAs' metabolism, leading to increases in their blood concentrations and accompanying toxicity. Drugs that prolong the QT interval including antiarrhythmics such as quinidine, the antihistamines astemizole and terfenadine, and some antipsychotics may increase the chance of ventricular dysrhythmias. TCAs may enhance the response to alcohol and the effects of barbiturates and other CNS depressants. Side effects may also be enhanced by other drugs that have antimuscarinic properties.

== Pharmacology ==
The majority of the TCAs act primarily as SNRIs by blocking the serotonin transporter (SERT) and the norepinephrine transporter (NET), which results in an elevation of the synaptic concentrations of these neurotransmitters, and therefore an enhancement of neurotransmission. Notably, with the sole exception of amineptine, the TCAs have weak affinity for the dopamine transporter (DAT), and therefore have low efficacy as dopamine reuptake inhibitors (DRIs). Both serotonin and norepinephrine have been highly implicated in depression and anxiety, and it has been shown that facilitation of their activity has beneficial effects on these mental disorders.

In addition to their reuptake inhibition, many TCAs also have high affinity as antagonists at the 5-HT_{1}, 5-HT_{2} (5-HT_{2A} and 5-HT_{2C}), 5-HT_{6}, 5-HT_{7}, α_{1}-adrenergic, and NMDA receptors, and as agonists at the sigma receptors (σ_{1} and σ_{2}), some of which may contribute to their therapeutic efficacy, as well as their side effects. The TCAs also have varying but typically high affinity for antagonising the H_{1} and H_{2} histamine receptors, as well as the muscarinic acetylcholine receptors. As a result, they also act as potent antihistamines and anticholinergics. These properties are often beneficial in antidepressants, especially with comorbid anxiety, as it provides a sedative effect.

Most, if not all, of the TCAs also potently inhibit sodium channels and L-type calcium channels, and therefore act as sodium channel blockers and calcium channel blockers, respectively. The former property is responsible for the high mortality rate upon overdose seen with the TCAs via cardiotoxicity. It may also be involved in their efficacy as analgesics, however.

In summary, tricyclic antidepressants can act through NMDA antagonism, opioidergic effects, sodium, potassium and calcium channel blocking, through interfering with the reuptake of serotonin and acting as antagonists to SHAM (serotonin, histamine, alpha, muscarinic) receptors.

=== Binding profiles ===
The binding profiles of various TCAs and some metabolites in terms of their affinities (K_{i}, nM) for various receptors and transporters are as follows:

Compound	SERT	NET	DAT	5-HT_{1A}	5-HT_{2A}	5-HT_{2C}	5-HT_{6}	5-HT_{7}	α_{1}	α_{2}	D_{2}	H_{1}	H_{2}	mACh	σ_{1}	σ_{2}
Amineptine	>100,000	10,000	1,000–1,400	>100,000	74,000	ND	ND	ND	>100,000	>100,000	>100,000	≥13,000	ND	>100,000	ND	ND
Amitriptyline	2.8–4.3	19–35	3,250	≥450	18–23	4.0	65–141	93–123	4.4–24	114–690	196–1,460	0.5–1.1	66	9.6	300	ND
Amoxapine	58	16	4,310	ND	0.5	2.0	6.0–50	41	50	2,600	3.6–160	7.9–25	ND	1,000	ND	ND
Butriptyline	≥1,360	5,100	3,940	7,000	380	ND	ND	ND	570	4,800	ND	1.1	ND	35	ND	ND
Clomipramine	0.14–0.28	38–54	≥2,190	≥7,000	27–36	65	54	127	3.2–38	≥535	78–190	13–31	209	37	546	ND
Desipramine	18–163	0.63–3.5	3,190	≥6,400	115–350	244–748	ND	>1,000	23–130	≥1,379	3,400	60–110	1,550	66–198	≥1,990	≥1,610
Dibenzepin	ND	ND	>10,000	>10,000	≥1,500	ND	ND	ND	>10,000	>10,000	>10,000	23	1,950	1,750	ND	ND
Dosulepin	8.6–78	46–70	5,310	4,000	152	ND	ND	ND	419	2,400	ND	3.6–4.0	ND	25–26	ND	ND
Doxepin	68–210	13–58	≥4,600	276	11–27	8.8–200	136	ND	24	28–1,270	360	0.09–1.23	174	23–80	ND	ND
Imipramine	1.3–1.4	20–37	8,500	≥5,800	80–150	120	190–209	>1,000	32	3,100	620–726	7.6–37	550	46	332–520	327–2,100
Iprindole	≥1,620	1,260	6,530	2,800	217–280	206	ND	ND	2,300	8,600	6,300	100–130	200–8,300	2,100	>10,000	ND
Lofepramine	70	5.4	>10,000	4,600	200	ND	ND	ND	100	2,700	2,000	245–360	4,270	67	2,520	ND
Maprotiline	5,800	11–12	1,000	ND	51	122	ND	50	90	9,400	350–665	0.79–2.0	776	570	ND	ND
Norclomipramine	40	0.45	2,100	19,000	130	ND	ND	ND	190	1,800	1,200	450	ND	92	ND	ND
Northiaden	192	25	2,539	2,623	141	ND	ND	ND	950	ND	ND	25	ND	110	ND	ND
Nortriptyline	15–18	1.8–4.4	1,140	294	5.0–41	8.5	148	ND	55	2,030	2,570	3.0–15	646	37	2,000	ND
Opipramol	≥2,200	≥700	≥3,000	>10,000	120	ND	ND	ND	200	6,100	120–300	6.0	4,470	3,300	0.2–50	110
Protriptyline	19.6	1.41	2,100	3,800	70	ND	ND	ND	130	6,600	2,300	7.2–25	398	25	ND	ND
Tianeptine	>10,000	>10,000	>10,000	>10,000	>10,000	>10,000	>10,000	>10,000	>10,000	>10,000	>10,000	>10,000	>10,000	>10,000	>10,000	>10,000
Trimipramine	149–2,110	≥2,450	≥3,780	8,000	32	537	ND	ND	24	680	143–210	0.27–1.5	41	58	ND	ND
Values are K_{i} (nM). The smaller the value, the more strongly the drug binds to the site. For assay species and references, see the individual drug articles. Most but not all values are for human proteins.

With the exception of the sigma receptors, the TCAs act as antagonists or inverse agonists of the receptors and as inhibitors of the transporters. Tianeptine is included in this list due to it technically being a TCA, but with a vastly different pharmacology.

Therapeutic levels of TCAs are generally in the range of about 100 to 300 ng/mL, or 350 to 1,100 nM. Plasma protein binding is generally 90% or greater.

== Chemistry ==
There are two major groups of TCAs in terms of chemical structure, which most, but not all, TCAs fall into. The groupings are based on the tricyclic ring system. They are the dibenzazepines (imipramine, desipramine, clomipramine, trimipramine, lofepramine) and the dibenzocycloheptadienes (amitriptyline, nortriptyline, protriptyline, butriptyline). Minor TCA groups based on ring system include the dibenzoxepins (doxepin), the dibenzothiepines (dosulepin), and the dibenzoxazepines (amoxapine).

In addition to classification based on the ring system, TCAs can also be usefully grouped based on the number of substitutions of the side chain amine. These groups include the tertiary amines (imipramine, clomipramine, trimipramine, amitriptyline, butriptyline, doxepin, dosulepin) and the secondary amines (desipramine, nortriptyline, protriptyline). Lofepramine is technically a tertiary amine, but acts largely as a prodrug of desipramine, a secondary amine, and hence is more similar in profile to the secondary amines than to the tertiary amines. Amoxapine does not have the TCA side chain and hence is neither a tertiary nor secondary amine, although it is often grouped with the secondary amines due to sharing more in common with them. In 2021, a new method was developed at the Institute for Bioengineering of Catalonia for designing photochromic analogs of tricyclic drugs like pirenzepine via (1) isosteric replacement of the two-atom bridge between the aromatic systems with an azo group and (2) opening of the central ring. The authors named the strategy "crypto-azologization". New photoswitchable analogs of the tricyclic drug carbamazepine have beed developed, including crypto-azologues and a tricyclic direct analog. Carbadiazocine is the first diazocine (bridged azobenzene) to be tested in vivo in photopharmacology, and has demonstrated noninvasive analgesia with amber light in an rat model of neuropathic pain.

== History ==
The TCAs were developed amid the "explosive birth" of psychopharmacology in the early 1950s. The story begins with the synthesis of chlorpromazine in December 1950 by Rhône-Poulenc's chief chemist, Paul Charpentier, from synthetic antihistamines developed by Rhône-Poulenc in the 1940s. Its psychiatric effects were first noticed at a hospital in Paris in 1952. The first widely used psychiatric drug, by 1955 it was already generating significant revenue as an antipsychotic. Research chemists quickly began to explore other derivatives of chlorpromazine.

The first TCA reported for the treatment of depression was imipramine, a dibenzazepine analogue of chlorpromazine code-named G22355. It was not originally targeted for the treatment of depression. The drug's tendency to induce manic effects was "later described as 'in some patients, quite disastrous'". The paradoxical observation of a sedative inducing mania led to testing with depressed patients. The first trial of imipramine took place in 1955 and the first report of antidepressant effects was published by Swiss psychiatrist Roland Kuhn in 1957. Some testing of Geigy's imipramine, then known as Tofranil, took place at the Münsterlingen Hospital near Konstanz. Geigy later became Ciba-Geigy and eventually Novartis.

Dibenzazepine derivatives are described in U.S. patent 3,074,931 issued 1963-01-22 by assignment to Smith Kline & French Laboratories. The compounds described share a tricyclic backbone different from the backbone of the TCA amitriptyline.

Merck introduced the second member of the TCA family, amitriptyline (Elavil), in 1961. This compound has a different three-ring structure than imipramine.

== Society and culture ==
=== Recreational use ===
A very small number of cases involving non-medical use of antidepressants have been reported over the past 30 years. According to the US government classification of psychiatric medications, TCAs are "non-abusable" and generally have low misuse potential. Nonetheless, due to their atypical mechanism of action, amineptine and tianeptine (dopamine reuptake inhibition and μ-opioid receptor agonism, respectively) are the two TCAs with the highest addiction and misuse potential. Several cases of the misuse of amitriptyline alone or together with methadone or in other drug dependent patients and of dosulepin with alcohol or in methadone patients have been reported.

== Veterinary use ==
TCAs are also used in veterinary medicine for anxiolytic, anticompulsive, and antiaggressive purposes. Most use is off-label, with the exception of clomipramine (Clomicalm chewable tablet), which is FDA-approved for separation anxiety in dogs when paired with behavior modification. Psychotrophic medication is generally not the first-line treatment for behavior problems. For example, although the American Association of Feline Practitioners (AAFP) and the International Society of Feline Medicine (ISFM) mention TCAs in their guide for the treatment of house-soiling in cats, they are to be attempted only for severe, recurrant cases, after all other methods have failed.

== List of TCAs ==
Those that preferentially inhibit the reuptake of serotonin (by at least 10-fold over norepinephrine) include:

- Butriptyline† (Evadyne) (relatively weak serotonin reuptake inhibitor)
- **Clomipramine** (Anafranil)
- **Imipramine** (Tofranil, Janimine, Praminil)
- **Trimipramine** (Surmontil) (relatively weak serotonin reuptake inhibitor)

Those that preferentially inhibit the reuptake of norepinephrine (by at least 10-fold over serotonin) include:

- Desipramine (Norpramin, Pertofrane)
- Dibenzepin‡ (Noveril, Victoril)
- Lofepramine§ (Lomont, Gamanil)
- **Maprotiline** (Ludiomil) – can be classed with the TCAs though more frequently classed with the TeCAs
- **Nortriptyline** (Pamelor, Aventyl, Norpress)
- Protriptyline (Vivactil)

Whereas either fairly balanced reuptake inhibitors of serotonin and norepinephrine or unspecified inhibitors include:

- **Amitriptyline** (Elavil, Endep)
- Amitriptylinoxide (Amioxid, Ambivalon, Equilibrin)
- Amoxapine (Asendin) – can be classed with the TeCAs but more frequently classed with the TCAs
- Demexiptiline† (Deparon, Tinoran)
- Dimetacrine† (Istonil, Istonyl, Miroistonil)
- **Dosulepin**§ (Prothiaden)
- **Doxepin** (Adapin, Sinequan)
- Fluacizine† (Phtorazisin)
- Imipraminoxide† (Imiprex, Elepsin)
- Melitracen§ (Deanxit, Dixeran, Melixeran, Trausabun)
- Metapramine† (Timaxel)
- Nitroxazepine‡ (Sintamil)
- Noxiptiline‡ (Agedal, Elronon, Nogedal)
- Pipofezine‡ (Azafen/Azaphen)
- Propizepine† (Depressin, Vagran)
- Quinupramine† (Kevopril, Kinupril, Adeprim, Quinuprine)

And the following are TCAs that act via main mechanisms other than serotonin or norepinephrine reuptake inhibition:

- Amineptine‡ (Survector, Maneon, Directim) – norepinephrine–dopamine reuptake inhibitor
- Iprindole† (Prondol, Galatur, Tetran) – 5-HT_{2} receptor antagonist
- Opipramol‡ (Insidon, Pramolan, Ensidon, Oprimol) – σ receptor agonist
- **Tianeptine** § (Stablon, Coaxil, Tatinol) – atypical μ-opioid receptor agonist

Legend:

- † indicates products which have been withdrawn from the market worldwide.
- ‡ indicates products which are not available in any country in which English is an official language.
- § indicates products which are not available in the United States, but are available in other English-speaking countries such as Australia, Canada, United Kingdom, etc.
- **Bolded names** indicates products which are available in at least three countries in which English is an official language.

== See also ==
- List of antidepressants
