= Imipraminoxide =

Chemical compound

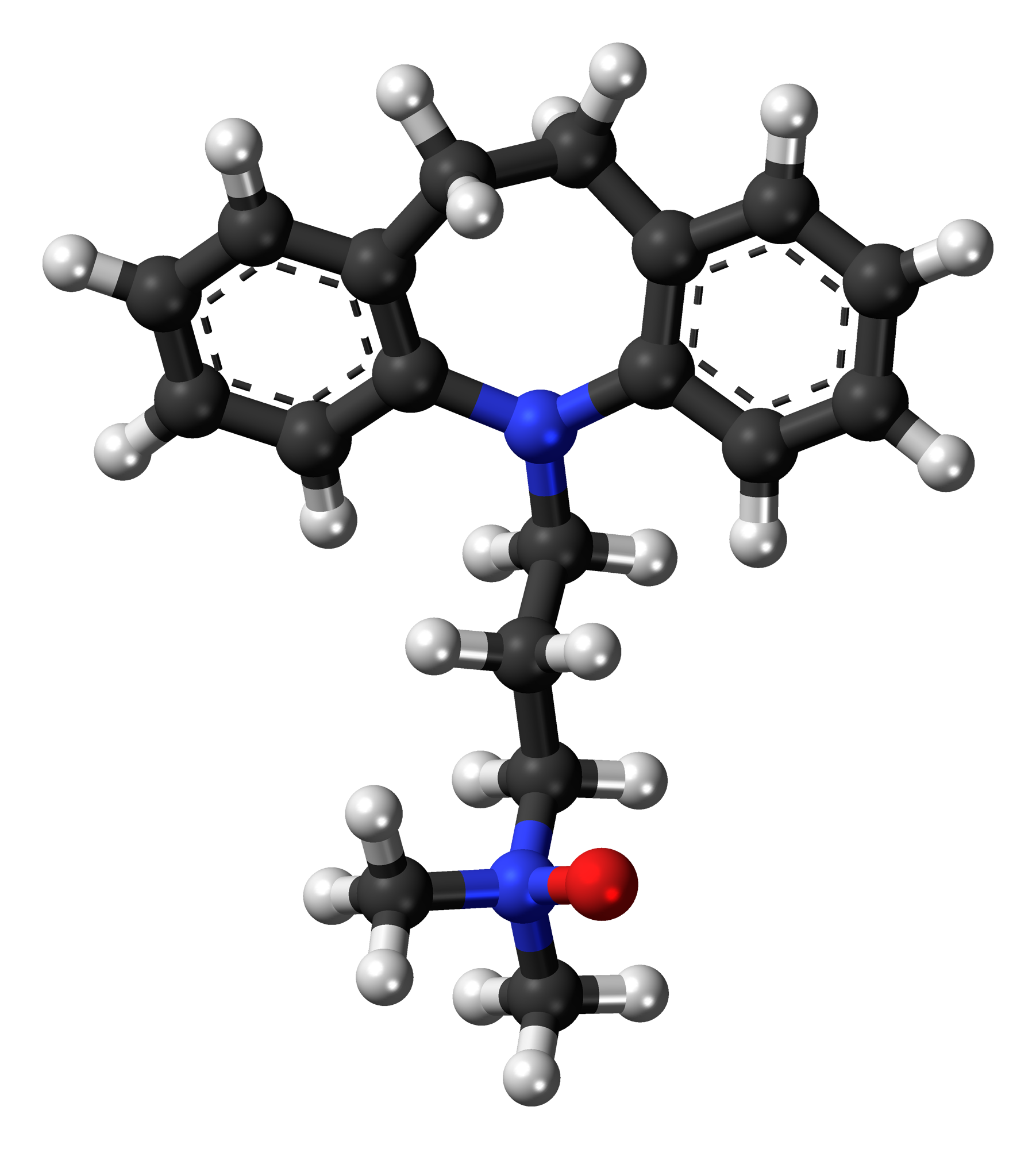

Clinical data
- Trade names: Imiprex, Elepsin
- Routes of administration: Oral
- ATC code: N06AA03 (WHO)

Legal status
- Legal status: BR: Class C1 (Other controlled substances); In general: ℞ (Prescription only)

Pharmacokinetic data
- Elimination half-life: Intravenous: 1.8 hours

Identifiers
- IUPAC name: 3-(5,6-dihydrobenzo[b][f]benzazepin- 11-yl)- N,N-dimethyl- propan- 1-amine N-oxide
- CAS Number: 6829-98-7
- PubChem CID: 65589
- DrugBank: DB13782
- ChemSpider: 59031
- UNII: 8MKS280XJW
- KEGG: D07334
- ChEMBL: ChEMBL1614644
- CompTox Dashboard (EPA): DTXSID40218445
- ECHA InfoCard: 100.027.188

Chemical and physical data
- Formula: C_{19}H_{24}N_{2}O
- Molar mass: 296.414 g·mol^{−1}

Imipraminoxide (brand names Imiprex, Elepsin), or imipramine N-oxide, is a tricyclic antidepressant (TCA) that was introduced in Europe in the 1960s for the treatment of depression.

Imipraminoxide is both an analogue and a metabolite of imipramine, and has similar effects. However, in clinical trials, imipraminoxide was found to have a faster onset of action, slightly higher efficacy, and fewer and less marked side effects, including diminished orthostatic hypotension and anticholinergic effects like dry mouth, sweating, dizziness, and fatigue.

Imipraminoxide's pharmacology has not been well elucidated, but based on its very close relationship with imipramine, it likely acts as a serotonin and norepinephrine reuptake inhibitor and serotonin, adrenenaline, histamine, and muscarinic acetylcholine receptor antagonist, though with weaker antiadrenergic and anticholinergic actions.

Imipraminoxide has been said to be a prodrug of imipramine.

== See also ==
- Amitriptylinoxide
