= Zotepine =

Atypical antipsychotic medication

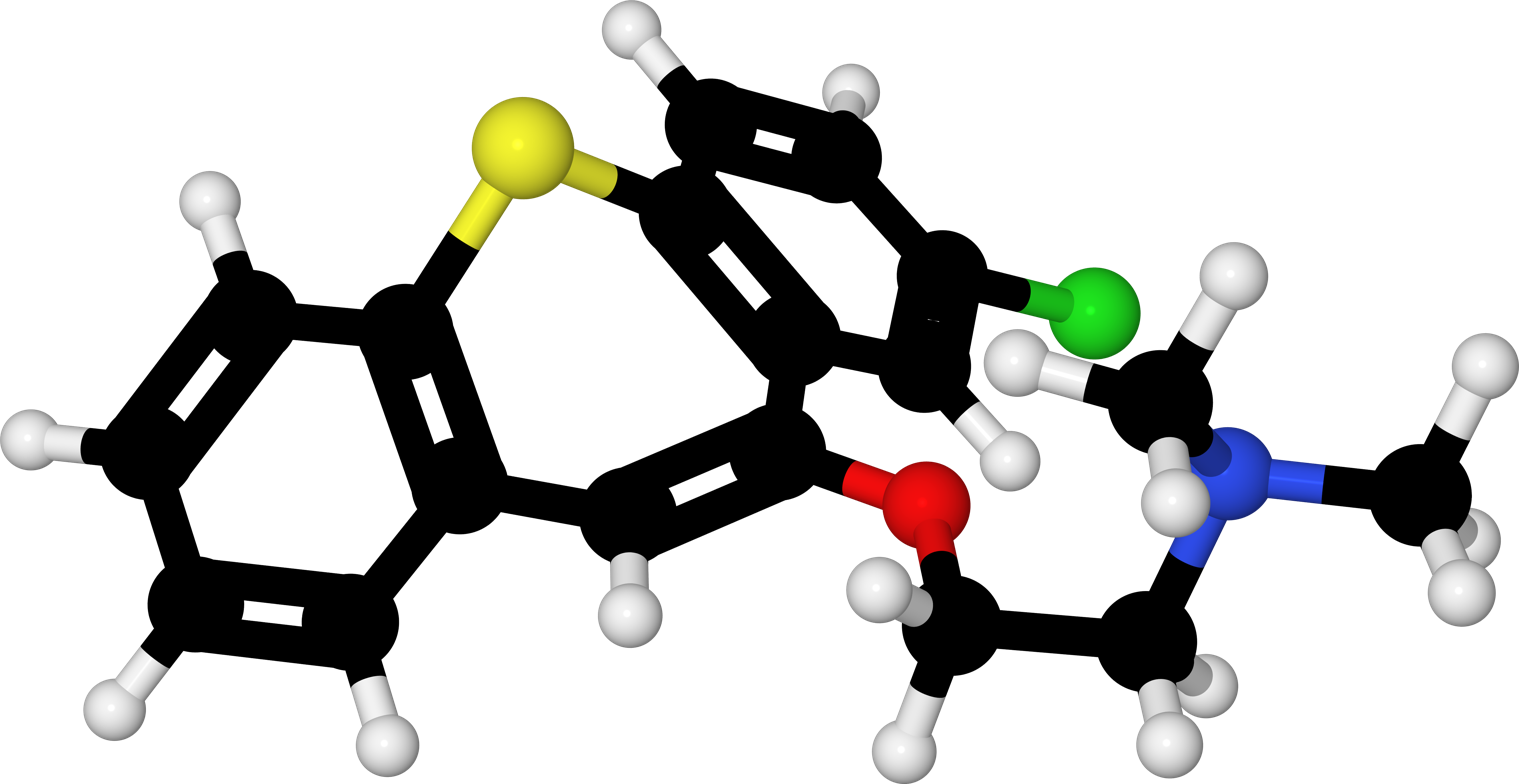

Clinical data
- Trade names: Zoleptil
- AHFS/Drugs.com: International Drug Names
- Routes of administration: Oral
- ATC code: N05AX11 (WHO)

Legal status
- Legal status: BR: Class C1 (Other controlled substances); In general: ℞ (Prescription only)

Pharmacokinetic data
- Bioavailability: 7–13% (oral)
- Metabolism: N-desmethylation to norzotepine (30-40%)
- Elimination half-life: 13.7–15.9 hours, 12 hours (Norzotepine)
- Excretion: 17% (Urine)

Identifiers
- IUPAC name: 2-(3-chlorobenzo[b][1]benzothiepin-5-yl)oxy-N,N-dimethylethanamine
- CAS Number: 26615-21-4
- PubChem CID: 5736
- IUPHAR/BPS: 103
- DrugBank: DB09225
- ChemSpider: 5534
- UNII: U29O83JAZW
- KEGG: D01321
- ChEBI: CHEBI:32316
- ChEMBL: ChEMBL285802
- PDB ligand: ZOT (PDBe, RCSB PDB)
- CompTox Dashboard (EPA): DTXSID9023756
- ECHA InfoCard: 100.189.143

Chemical and physical data
- Formula: C_{18}H_{18}ClNOS
- Molar mass: 331.86 g·mol^{−1}
- 3D model (JSmol): Interactive image
- SMILES: Clc2cc1C(/OCCN(C)C)=C\c3c(Sc1cc2)cccc3
- InChI: InChI=1S/C18H18ClNOS/c1-20(2)9-10-21-16-11-13-5-3-4-6-17(13)22-18-8-7-14(19)12-15(16)18/h3-8,11-12H,9-10H2,1-2H3; Key:HDOZVRUNCMBHFH-UHFFFAOYSA-N

Zotepine is an atypical antipsychotic drug indicated for acute and chronic schizophrenia. It has been used in Germany since 1990 (although it has been discontinued in Germany) and Japan since 1982.

Zotepine is not approved for use in the United States, United Kingdom, Australia, Canada or New Zealand.

== Medical uses ==
Zotepine's primary use is as a treatment for schizophrenia although clinical trials have been conducted (with positive results) into its efficacy as an antimanic agent in patients with acute bipolar mania. In a 2013 study in a comparison of 15 antipsychotic drugs in effectivity in treating schizophrenic symptoms, zotepine demonstrated medium-strong effectivity. Less effective than clozapine, slightly less effective than olanzapine and risperidone, approximately as effective as paliperidone, and slightly more effective than haloperidol, quetiapine, and aripiprazole.

== Side effects ==
Common

- Tachycardia
- Hypotension
- Orthostatic hypotension
- Palpitations
- Hyperprolactinaemia
- Weight gain (produces a similar degree of weight gain to that seen with clozapine and olanzapine treatment)
- Somnolence (2nd highest effect size for causing sedation out of fifteen antipsychotics compared in a recent meta-analysis)
- Extrapyramidal side effects [EPSE] (2nd largest odds ratio for causing EPSE out of fifteen antipsychotics compared in a recent meta-analysis, second only to haloperidol)
- Constipation
- Xerostomia (dry mouth)
- Blurred vision
- Hypersalivation (drooling)
- Mydriasis
- Anxiety
- Agitation
- Rhinitis
- Sexual dysfunction
- Dyspnoea
- Diarrhoea
- Influenza-like symptoms
- Cough
- Vertigo
- Confusion
- Dyspepsia
- Flushing dry skin
- Arthralgia
- Myalgia
- Acne
- Conjunctivitis
- Thrombocythaemia

Unknown frequency

- QT interval prolongation
- Hyperthermia
- Hypothermia
- Increased serum creatinine
- Hyperglycaemia
- Hypoglycaemia
- Hyperlipidaemia
- Thirst
- Urinary incontinence

Rare

- Angle-closure glaucoma
- Agranulocytosis
- Neutropaenia
- Eosinophilia
- Leukocytopenia
- Hypoesthesia
- Anaemia
- Myoclonus
- Myasthenia
- Alopecia
- Thrombocytopaenia
- Bradycardia
- Epistaxis
- Abdominal enlargement
- Deep vein thrombosis
- Paralytic ileus
- Leukopenia
- Tardive dyskinesia
- Neuroleptic malignant syndrome
- Laryngeal edema
- Urinary retention
- Depression
- Ataxia
- Amnesia
- Seizure (dose-dependent risk)
- Metabolic syndrome
- Diabetes mellitus type II
- Cholestasis
- Increased liver enzymes
- Photosensitivity
- Exanthema
- Pruritus
- Hypouricemia
- Oedema

== Pharmacology ==
=== Pharmacodynamics ===
The antipsychotic effect of zotepine is thought to be mediated through antagonist activity at dopamine and serotonin receptors. Zotepine has a high affinity for the D_{1} and D_{2} receptors. It also affects the 5-HT_{2A}, 5-HT_{2C}, 5-HT_{6}, and 5-HT_{7} receptors. In addition, its active metabolite, norzotepine, serves as a potent norepinephrine reuptake inhibitor.

Macromolecule (Receptor or transporter protein)	K_{i} [nM]
SERT	151
NET	530
DAT	3621
5-HT_{1A}	470.5
5-HT_{1B}	59.5
5-HT_{1D}	119
5-HT_{1E}	700
5-HT_{2A}	2.7
5-HT_{2C}	2.6
5-HT_{3}	472
5-HT_{5A}	29
5-HT_{6}	6
5-HT_{7}	12
α_{1A}	7
α_{1B}	5
α_{2A}	180
α_{2B}	5.35
α_{2C}	106
M_{1}	18
M_{2}	140
M_{3}	73
M_{4}	77
M_{5}	260
D_{1}	71
D_{2}	25
D_{2S}	5.4
D_{2L}	11
D_{3}	6.4
D_{4}	18
D_{5}	248
H_{1}	3.21
H_{2}	500
H_{4}	1977

== Synthesis ==

The reaction of 2-chloroacetophenone with 4-chlorothiophenol gives a thioether. This is treated with morpholine and sulfur in a Willgerodt–Kindler reaction to give a phenylacetic acid derivative after acid hydrolysis of the amide intermediate. Cyclization of this compound in the presence of polyphosphoric acid forms the dibenzothiepin ring system of the drug. The enol ether, zotepine, is produced when this is treated with the chloroethyl amine and potassium carbonate in methyl isobutyl ketone as solvent. Under these conditions, the undesired product of C-alkylation is minimised.

== Society and culture ==
=== Brand names ===
Brand names include Losizopilon (JP), Lodopin (ID, JP), Nipolept (DE†), Setous (JP), Zoleptil (CZ, PT, TR, UK†), Zotewin (IN); where † indicates a formulation that has been discontinued.

== See also ==
- Carbinoxamine, diphenhydramine, doxylamine, orphenadrine — the termination chain is the same
- Clotiapine - the base is similar
- Noxiptyline - the termination chain is similar
- Toll-like receptor 4 — investigating probable antagonistic (antiinflammatory) property of several TCA-based molecules
