= Amitriptylinoxide =

Chemical compound

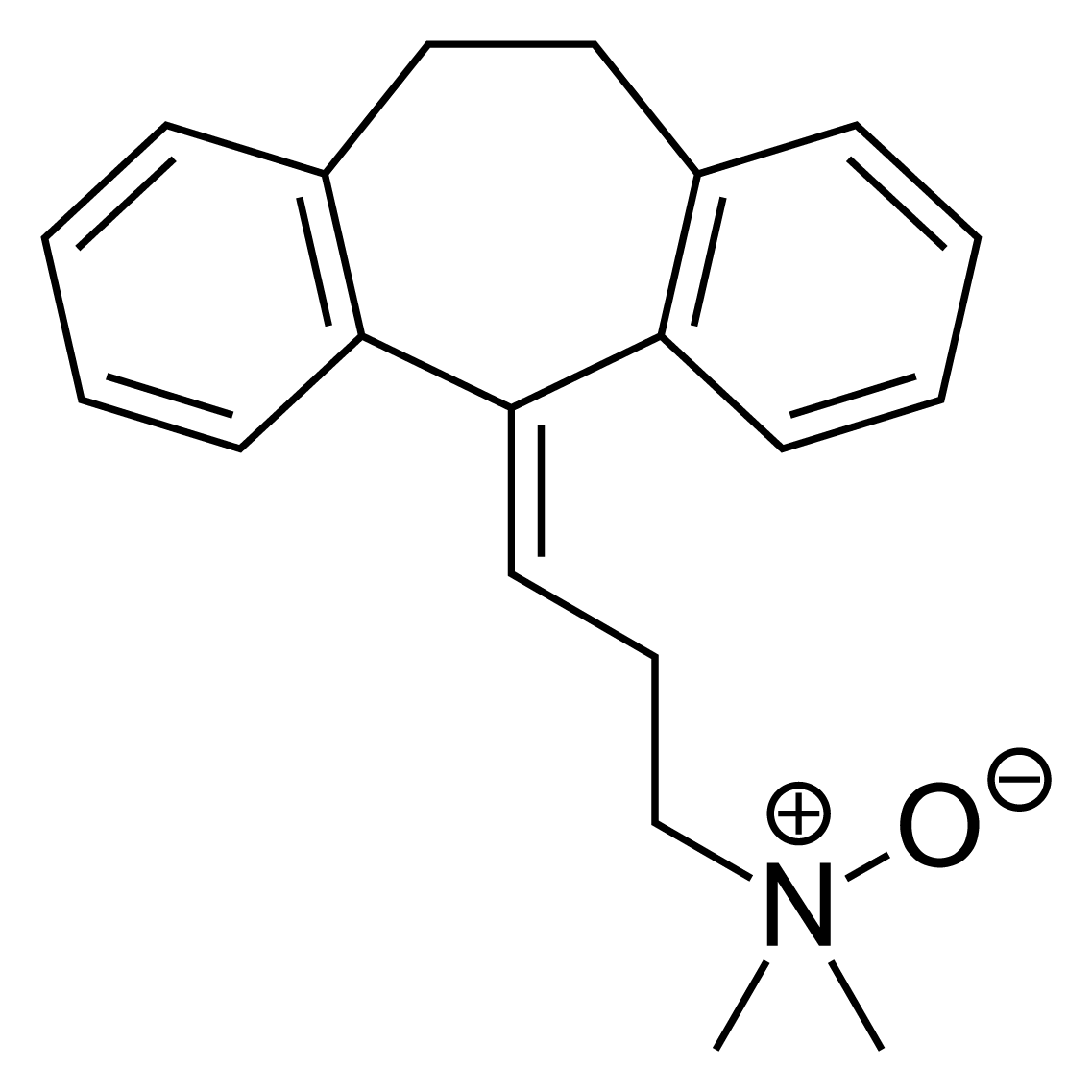

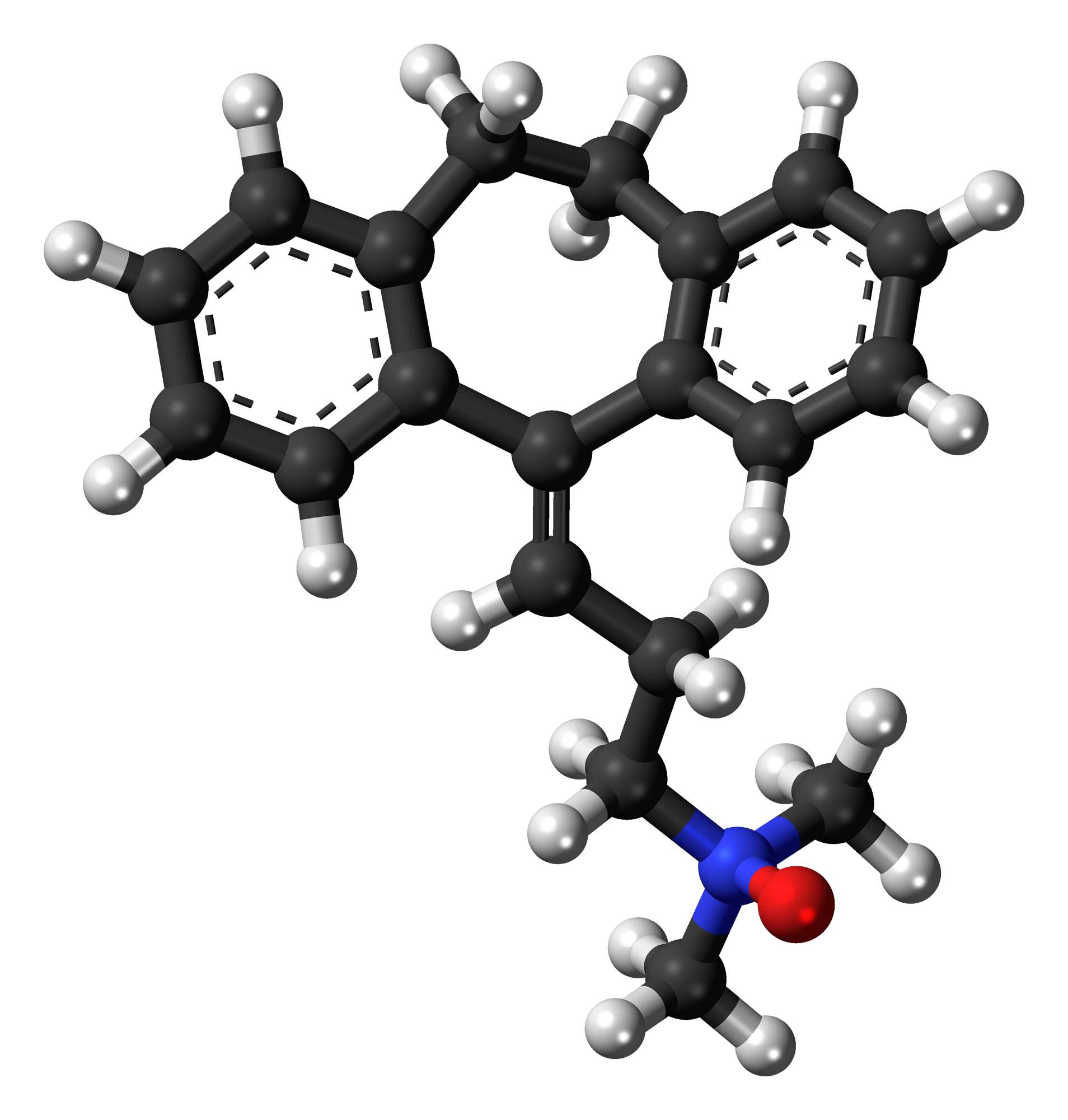

Clinical data
- Trade names: Amioxid, Ambivalon, Equilibrin
- Routes of administration: Oral
- ATC code: N06AA25 (WHO)

Legal status
- Legal status: In general: ℞ (Prescription only)

Identifiers
- IUPAC name: 3-(10,11-dihydro- 5H-dibenzo[a,d]cycloheptene- 5-ylidene)- N,N-dimethyl- 1-propanamine N-oxide
- CAS Number: 4317-14-0
- PubChem CID: 20313
- DrugBank: DB13114
- ChemSpider: 19137
- UNII: TYR2U59WMA
- KEGG: D07449
- ChEBI: CHEBI:135224
- ChEMBL: ChEMBL627
- CompTox Dashboard (EPA): DTXSID50195758
- ECHA InfoCard: 100.119.550

Chemical and physical data
- Formula: C_{20}H_{23}NO
- Molar mass: 293.410 g·mol^{−1}
- 3D model (JSmol): Interactive image
- SMILES: [O-][N+](C)(C)CC/C=C2/c1c(cccc1)CCc3c2cccc3
- InChI: InChI=1S/C20H23NO/c1-21(2,22)15-7-12-20-18-10-5-3-8-16(18)13-14-17-9-4-6-11-19(17)20/h3-6,8-12H,7,13-15H2,1-2H3; Key:ZPMKQFOGINQDAM-UHFFFAOYSA-N

Amitriptylinoxide (brand names Amioxid, Ambivalon, Equilibrin), or amitriptyline N-oxide, is a tricyclic antidepressant (TCA) which was introduced in Europe in the 1970s for the treatment of depression.

Amitriptylinoxide is both an analogue and metabolite of amitriptyline, and has similar effects as well as equivalent efficacy as an antidepressant. However, it has a faster onset of action and fewer adverse effects, including reduced drowsiness, sedation, anticholinergic symptoms like dry mouth, sweating, and dizziness, orthostatic hypotension, and cardiotoxicity.

In receptor binding assays, amitriptylinoxide was found to have generally equivalent pharmacology to amitriptyline, acting as a serotonin and norepinephrine reuptake inhibitor, serotonin receptor antagonist, and H_{1} receptor antagonist, among other properties, but with approximately 60-fold lower affinity for the α_{1}-adrenergic receptor, and the weakest affinity of any of the TCAs analyzed for the muscarinic acetylcholine receptors.

Amitriptylinoxide has been said to be a prodrug of amitriptyline.

== See also ==
- Imipraminoxide
