= Alphapharm =

Australian drug manufacturer

- Type: Subsidiary
- Industry: Health care
- Founded: 1982; 44 years ago
- Headquarters: Sydney, Australia
- Number of employees: 600
- Parent: Mylan Inc.
- Website: alphapharm.com.au

Alphapharm is a generic drug manufacturing company based in Australia. Alphapharm manufactures many different generic pharmaceutical medicines and exports to 50 countries. It is owned by Mylan Pharmaceuticals (USA) which merged with Upjohn on November 16, 2020, to become Viatris. Alphapharm's logo is a green circle with a white lowercase alpha enclosed. Alphapharm is the largest sole supplier to the Australian Pharmaceutical Benefits Scheme by number of PBS subsidised prescriptions.
