= Bisulepin =

Chemical compound

Clinical data
- ATC code: R06AX (WHO)

Identifiers
- IUPAC name: (3E)-N,N-dimethyl-3-(thieno[2,3-c][2]benzothiepin-4(9H)-ylidene)propan-1-amine
- CAS Number: 42504-83-6
- PubChem CID: 6537425
- ChemSpider: 5020597
- UNII: 595726R32U
- ChEBI: CHEBI:135277
- CompTox Dashboard (EPA): DTXSID301336166 DTXSID40973608, DTXSID301336166
- ECHA InfoCard: 100.024.867

Chemical and physical data
- Formula: C_{17}H_{19}NS_{2}
- Molar mass: 301.47 g·mol^{−1}
- 3D model (JSmol): Interactive image
- SMILES: CN(C)CC\C=C1\c2ccsc2SCc2ccccc12

Bisulepin is strong and relatively selective antihistamine (H_{1} antagonist) with hypnotic, antiadrenergic and very weak anticholinergic and antiserotonergic effects. Bisulepin is marketed in the Czech Republic and Slovakia under the trademark Dithiaden as tablets and injections.

The registered active form is the trans- (i.e. E-) isomer.

== See also ==
- Dosulepin
- Doxepin
