= Tricyclic =

Organic compound having 3 fused rings

Dibenzazepine

Phenothiazine

Tricyclics are cyclic chemical compounds that contain three fused rings of atoms.

Many compounds have a tricyclic structure, but in pharmacology, the term has traditionally been reserved to describe heterocyclic drugs. They include antidepressants, antipsychotics, anticonvulsants, and antihistamines (as antiallergens, anti-motion sickness drugs, antipruritics, and hypnotics/sedatives) of the dibenzazepine, dibenzocycloheptene, dibenzothiazepine, dibenzothiepin, phenothiazine, and thioxanthene chemical classes, and others.

== History ==
- Promethazine and other first generation antihistamines with a tricyclic structure were discovered in the 1940s.
- Chlorpromazine, derived from promethazine originally as a sedative, was found to have neuroleptic properties in the early 1950s, and was the first typical antipsychotic.
- Imipramine, originally investigated as an antipsychotic, was discovered in the early 1950s, and was the first tricyclic antidepressant.
- Carbamazepine was discovered in 1953, and was subsequently introduced as an anticonvulsant in 1965.
- Clozapine, a derivative of imipramine, was synthesized in 1958 and entered the European market in 1972 under the name Leponex.
- Antidepressants with a tetracyclic structure such as mianserin and maprotiline were first developed in the 1970s as tetracyclic antidepressants.
- Loratadine was introduced as a non-sedating second generation antihistamine in the 1990s.

== Gallery ==
Antidepressants
Imipramine	Amitriptyline	Iprindole	Tianeptine	Doxepin
Antipsychotics
Chlorpromazine	Thioridazine	Chlorprothixene	Loxapine	Clozapine
Antihistamines
Promethazine	Cyproheptadine	Latrepirdine	Loratadine	Rupatadine
Others
Carbamazepine	Carvedilol		Cyclobenzaprine	Pizotifen

== See also ==
- Bisulepin
- Tetracyclic
- Tricyclic tropane analogs
- Heterocyclic
- Tricyclic antidepressant
