= Demexiptiline =

Chemical compound

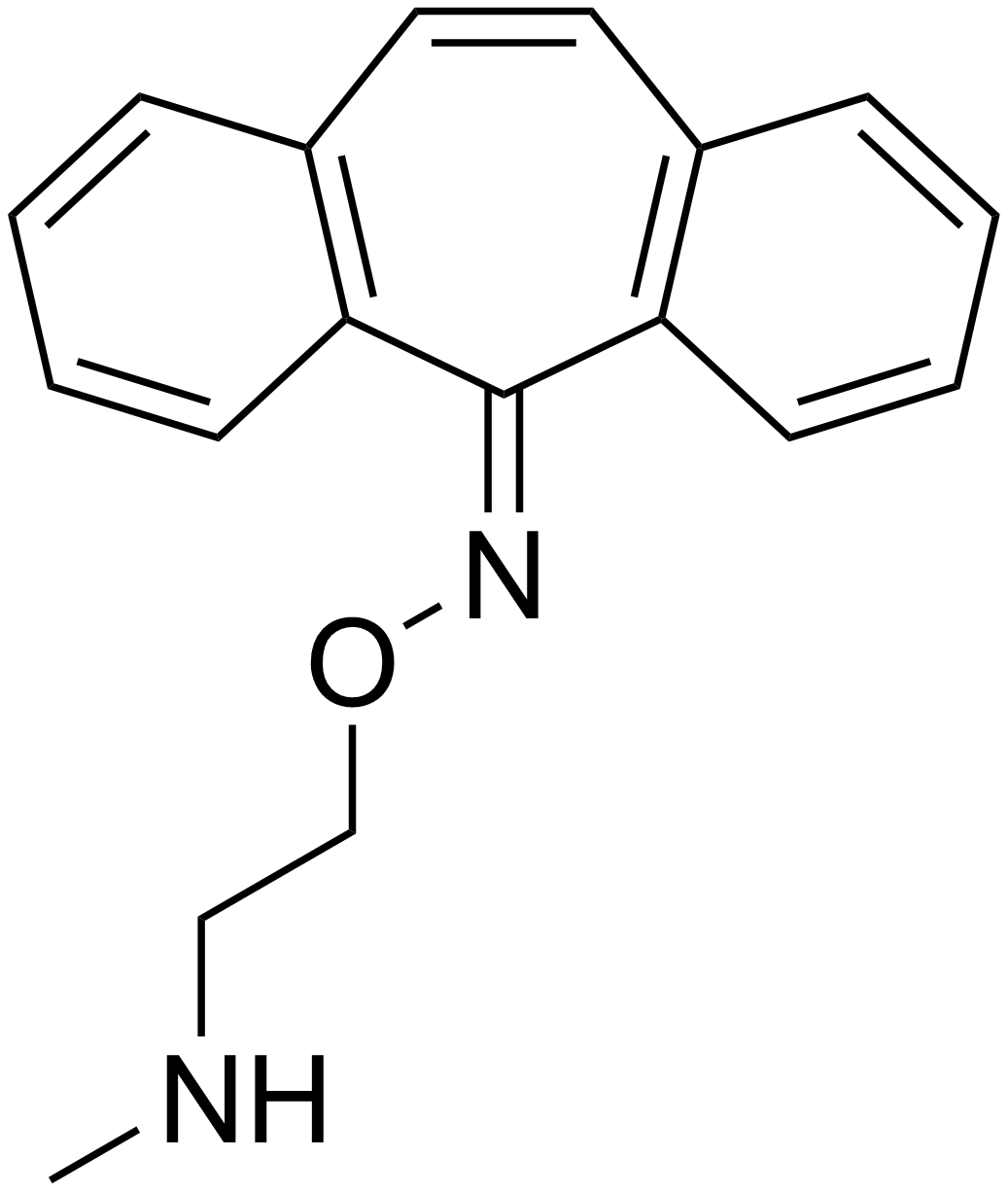

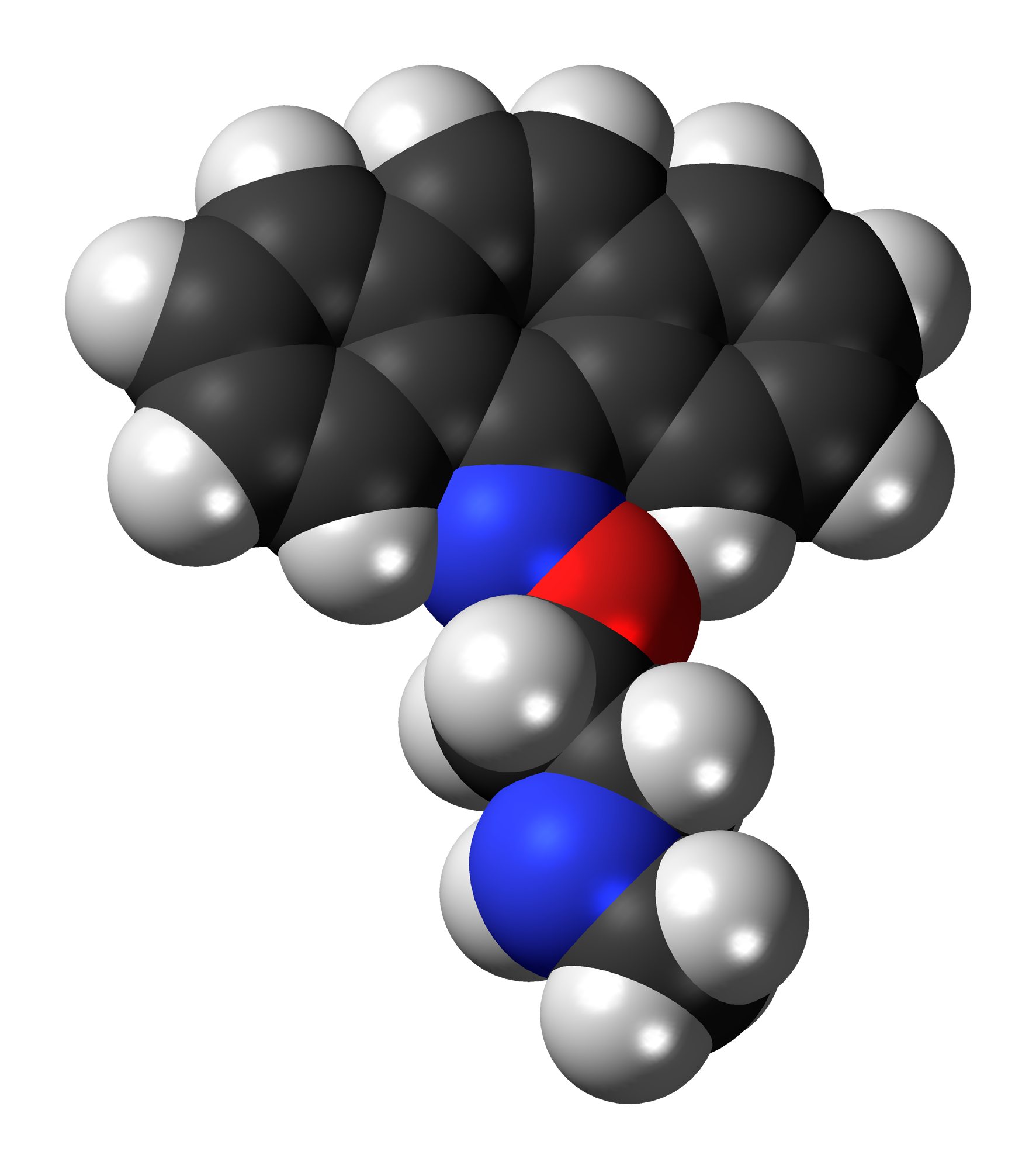

Clinical data
- Trade names: Deparon, Tinoran
- Routes of administration: Oral
- ATC code: none

Legal status
- Legal status: In general: ℞ (Prescription only)

Pharmacokinetic data
- Elimination half-life: 35 hours

Identifiers
- IUPAC name: 5H-dibenzo(a,d)cyclohepten-5-one O-(2-(methylamino)ethyl)oxime
- CAS Number: 24701-51-7
- PubChem CID: 28876
- DrugBank: DB08998
- ChemSpider: 26858
- UNII: EYX738UZ5P
- ChEMBL: ChEMBL2107576
- CompTox Dashboard (EPA): DTXSID40179441

Chemical and physical data
- Formula: C_{18}H_{18}N_{2}O
- Molar mass: 278.355 g·mol^{−1}
- 3D model (JSmol): Interactive image
- SMILES: O(\N=C3/c1ccccc1\C=C/c2c3cccc2)CCNC

Demexiptiline (brand names Deparon, Tinoran) is a tricyclic antidepressant (TCA) used in France for the treatment of depression. It acts primarily as a norepinephrine reuptake inhibitor similarly to desipramine.

== Synthesis ==

The ketone dibenzosuberenone (1) is treated with hydroxylamine (2) to give its ketoxime (3). Base-catalyzed alkylation with ClCH_{2}CH_{2}NHCH_{3} (4) yields demexiptiline.
