= Dibenzothiepin =

Class of chemical compounds

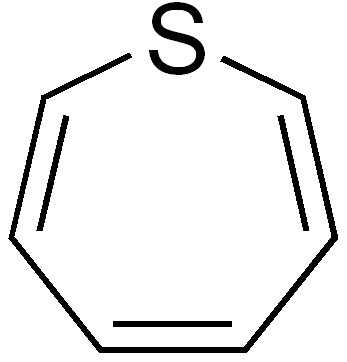
thiepin

Dibenzothiepins are chemical compounds which are derivatives of thiepin with two benzene (here called benzo) rings.

dosulepin	methiothepin	zotepine	Perithiaden
