= Benzhydryl compounds =

Organic compounds which include diphenylmethane

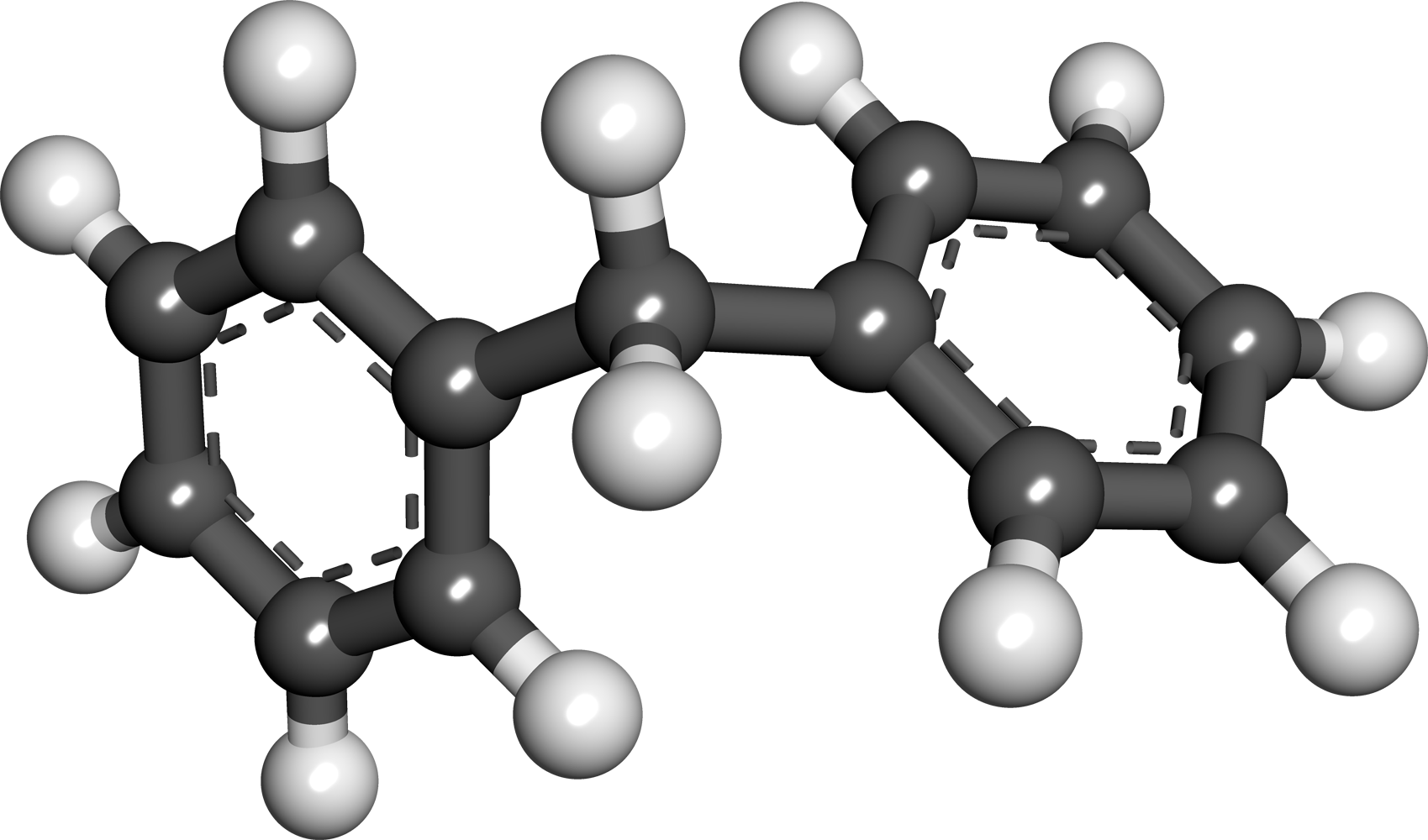
Ball-and-stick model of diphenylmethane

The benzhydryl compounds are a group of organic compounds whose parent structures include diphenylmethane (which is two benzene rings connected by a single methane), with any number of attached substituents, including bridges. This group typically excludes compounds in which either benzene is fused to another ring (bicyclic, tricyclic, polycyclic) or includes a heteroatom, or where the methane connects to three or four benzenes.

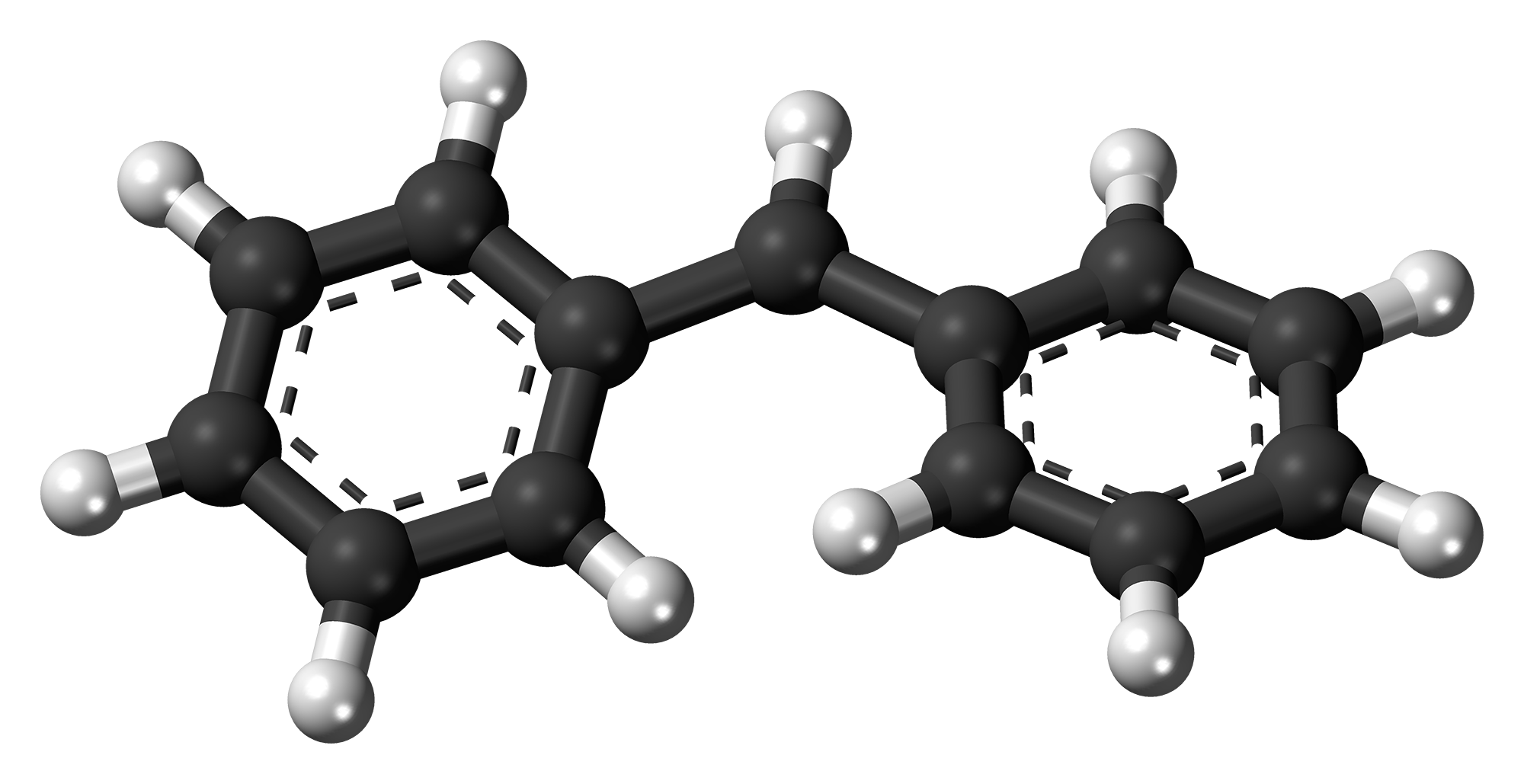
Ball-and-stick model of the benzhydryl radical

The benzhydryl radical can be abbreviated Ph_{2}CH• or Bzh.

== Carboaromatic ==
=== Alcohols ===
- Acyclic: pridinol
- Pyrolidino: diphenylprolinol
- 2-Piperidine: pipradrol
- 4-Piperidine: terfenadine, fexofenadine
- Benzilic ester: QNB, JB-336, JB-318, benactyzine

=== Alkenes ===
- Tricycle: amitriptyline, melitracen, cyclobenzaprine, tianeptine, amineptine, clopenthixol, chlorprothixene, flupentixol, thiothixene, zuclopenthixol
- Tricyclic and piperidine: pimethixene, cyproheptadine
- Acyclic: gilutensin

=== Alkyl(amine)s ===
- Acyclic: (3-phenylpropylamine), tolpropamine, tolterodine
- Piperidine: desoxypipradrol, budipine
- N-alkyl-4-piperidinol: penfluridol
- N-arylalkyl-piperidine: pimozide
- Tetrahydronaphthalene: tametraline (4-phenylaminotetralin), sertraline
- Tetrahydroisoquinoline: nomifensine, diclofensine "tetrahydronaphisoquinoline", dinapsoline (see doxanthrine and dinoxyline)
- Pyrroloisoquinoline: JNJ-7925476
- Indanamine: Lu 19-005
- Tricyclic: 9-Aminomethyl-9,10-dihydroanthracene, phenindamine (see MPTP)
- Tetracyclic: maprotiline, dihydrexidine, butaclamol, ecopipam
- Tetrahydrobenzazepine: SKF-83959, SKF-82958, SKF-81297, SKF 38393, fenoldopam, 6-Br-APB, SCH 23390
- Piperazine: amperozide
- Triazaspiro: fluspirilene

=== Alkoxy compounds ===
- Acyclic (3 °C): diphenhydramine (cf. deramciclane), orphenadrine, p-methyldiphenhydramine
- Acyclic (4 °C): moxastine, Clemastine, embramine,
- Piperazine: GBR-12935, GBR 12909, DBL-583
- Tropine: benztropine, deptropine, etybenzatropine, difluoropine
- Piperidine: diphenylpyraline
- Phthalane: talopram, citalopram
- Octahedral: nefopam
- Benzdihydropyran: A-68930 (isochromene)

=== Amines ===
- Piperazine: cyclizine, clocinizine, hydroxyzine, meclozine, cetirizine, dotarizine, cinnarizine
- Benzazepine: mianserin
- Tetracyclic: dizocilpine

=== Other ===
- Aromatic alkoxy: bifemelane, phenyltoloxamine
- Keto: phenadoxone, methadone, dipipanone, etc.
- Amido: dextromoramide
- Imino: benzodiazepine, GYKI-52895
- Sulfinyl: modafinil, adrafinil
- Pituxate gem-diphenylcyclopropane

== Heteroaromatic ==
These species are not strictly benzhydryl-containing but are analogous.

=== Heteroaromatic rings ===
- Alkene: thiambutene, loratadine
- Alkylamine: A-86929, amfonelic acid

=== Benzenes linked by a non-carbon atom ===
- Nitrogen: promethazine, imipramine, acepromazine, chlorpromazine, fluphenazine, mesoridazine, levomepromazine, perazine, periciazine, perphenazine, prochlorperazine, sulforidazine, thioridazine, trifluoperazine, triflupromazine, clozapine, thiethylperazine
- Indolic nitrogen: sertindole
- Oxygen: loxapine, asenapine, tyrima

=== Benzene and heterocycle linked through a non-carbon ===
- Olanzapine
