= Dibenzosuberenone =

Names
- Other names 5H-Dibenzo[a,d]cyclohepten-5-one

Identifiers
CAS Number	2222-33-5
3D model (JSmol)	Interactive image
ChEMBL	ChEMBL1535826
ChemSpider	15816
ECHA InfoCard	100.017.035
EC Number	218-737-3
PubChem CID	16679
UNII	XQJHQ6T1YB
CompTox Dashboard (EPA)	DTXSID4062274
- InChI: InChI=1S/C15H10O/c16-15-13-7-3-1-5-11(13)9-10-12-6-2-4-8-14(12)15/h1-10H Key: SNVTZAIYUGUKNI-UHFFFAOYSA-N
- SMILES: C1=CC=C2C(=C1)C=CC3=CC=CC=C3C2=O

Properties
Chemical formula	C_{15}H_{10}O
Molar mass	206.24 g/mol
Density	g/cm^{3} (20°C)
- Except where otherwise noted, data are given for materials in their standard state (at 25 °C [77 °F], 100 kPa). Infobox references

5-Dibenzosuberenone is an organic chemical with use in drug synthesis. Chemically speaking, the structure can be described as a benzophenone moiety bonded through an ethylene bridge into a seven membered ring. In contrast to dibenzosuberone, dibenzosuberenone does not contain any sp3 hybridized bonds.

== Applications ==
Dibenzosuberenone predominantly has uses in the synthesis of tricyclic antidepressants.

- Citenamide
- Cyclobenzaprine
- Cyproheptadine
- Decitropine
- Demexiptiline
- Dinorcyclobenzaprine
- Dizocilpine
- Intriptyline
- Mariptiline
- Norcyclobenzaprine [303-50-4]
- Norcyproheptadine [14051-46-8]
- Octriptyline
- Octripyline imine (6 times the potency of amitriptyline)
- Protriptyline
- Zosuquidar
- AH-1058 [300347-11-9]
- AP-792
- CPG 146 [41695-43-6], CPG 147 [41695-46-9], CPG 148, CPG 186, CPG 191 [41695-49-2], CPG 264 [41695-45-8]
- Wy-41770 [4517-99-1]
- AT 1015 [190508-50-0]
- MK-940 PC21125987 [5154-92-7]

== Synthesis ==
Dibenzosuberenone is made from dibenzosuberone by dehydrogenation.

In an alternative method dibenzosuberone is halogenated with NBS; dehydrohalogenation then also furnishes the target molecule. In an older document molecular bromine was used under irradiation. This gave a 70-90% yield of product.

2-Carboxybenzaldehyde [119-67-5] and hydroxyphthalide [16859-59-9] exist together in a tautomeric equilibrium. Wittig reaction to this forms predominantly (Z)-2-stilbenecarboxylic acid [66374-10-5]. It is important to mention that the Z-isomer is indeed the favored product of this step and not the trans-isomer. Cyclization of the carboxylic acid in polyphosphoric acid then also forms dibenzosuberenone.
