= Dibenzosuberone =

Names
- Other names 10,11-dihydro-5H-Dibenzo[a,d]cyclohepten-5-one, dibenzocycloheptanone

Identifiers
CAS Number	1210-35-1
3D model (JSmol)	Interactive image
ChEMBL	ChEMBL1905787
ChemSpider	13927
ECHA InfoCard	100.013.557
EC Number	214-912-3
PubChem CID	14589
UNII	8ETK71TH0H
CompTox Dashboard (EPA)	DTXSID4049400
- InChI: InChI=1S/C15H12O/c16-15-13-7-3-1-5-11(13)9-10-12-6-2-4-8-14(12)15/h1-8H,9-10H2 Key: BMVWCPGVLSILMU-UHFFFAOYSA-N
- SMILES: C1CC2=CC=CC=C2C(=O)C3=CC=CC=C31

Properties
Chemical formula	C_{15}H_{12}O
Molar mass	208.25 g/mol
Density	g/cm^{3} (20°C)
- Except where otherwise noted, data are given for materials in their standard state (at 25 °C [77 °F], 100 kPa). Infobox references

Dibenzosuberone is an organic chemical with use in drug synthesis. Chemically speaking, it is benzophenone bonded by a 2 carbon bridge into a seven membered ring. In contrast to dibenzosuberenone, the 2 carbon bridge is saturated with hydrogen and is not an olefin. In the dihydro series, the two benzene rings are not only out of plane, but also helical with respect to one another.

== Applications ==
It is the precursor needed to make many tricyclic antidepressants:

- Amitriptyline
- Amineptine
- Butaclamol (& Taclamine & Dexclamol)
- Butriptyline
- Cotriptyline
- Cyheptamide
- Cyheptropine
- Deptramine [2521-79-1] (c.f. Diphenhydramine)
- Deptropine
- Hepzidine
- Piroheptine
- Nortriptyline
- Noxiptiline
- Oxitriptyline
- Trecadrine
- Ciheptolane
- WAS-4206
- AY-8794 [19660-95-8]
- Desoxypipradrol analog
- PC10895908 (Amitriptyline-Pethidine hybrid)
- ReN-1869 [170149-99-2]

== Synthesis ==
Although in Lednicer's notes hydroiodic acid (HI) reduction gave the stilbene, according to background literature it appeared as if it the reduction went straight through to (3). Synthesis:

The aldol reaction between phthalide [87-41-2] (1) and benzaldehyde gave benzalphthalide [575-61-1] (2). This was then reduced with hydroiodic acid and red phosphorus to give 2-bibenzylcarboxylic acid [4890-85-1] (3). Alternatively, a catalytic hydrogenation can be performed using dipentene as the source of hydrogen. Although this is a slightly lower yielding method, it does not have the limitations of using hydroiodic acid, which is a safety hazard on a large scale. The ring closure with polyphosphoric acid gave dibenzosuberone (4) in good yield, although Friedel–Crafts reaction is an alternative method.

An alternative procedure is described:

Phthalic anhydride (1) and phenylacetic acid (2) in the presence of sodium acetate also gives benzalphthalide [575-61-1] (3). Apparently an aldol type addition, followed by a dehydration and decarboxylation explains the mechanism. Base catalyzed hydrolysis to 2-(Phenylacetyl)benzoic acid [33148-55-9] (4), and catalytic hydrogenation also gives 2-bibenzylcarboxylic acid [4890-85-1] (5).

Alternatively, benzalphthalide [575-61-1] can be catalytically hydrogenated over Raney Nickel in IPA solvent to 2-(2-phenylethyl)benzoic acid in 96% yield (importantly methanol and ethanol gave no reduction.

The intramolecular cyclization step was optimized with Nafion-H.

A milder and greener approach was recently devised:
