= C18H23NO =

The molecular formula C_{18}H_{23}NO (molar mass: 269.38 g/mol, exact mass: 269.1780 u) may refer to:

- Bifemelane
- 4-Methyldiphenhydramine
- Moxastine, or mephenhydramine
- Orphenadrine
