= Hepzidine =

Chemical compound

Identifiers
- IUPAC name: 4-(10,11-Dihydro-5H-dibenzo[a,d][7]annulen-5-yloxy)-1-methylpiperidine
- CAS Number: 1096-72-6
- PubChem CID: 70593
- ChemSpider: 63761
- UNII: 72FH6333M6
- ChEMBL: ChEMBL522580
- CompTox Dashboard (EPA): DTXSID20883195

Chemical and physical data
- Formula: C_{21}H_{25}NO
- Molar mass: 307.437 g·mol^{−1}
- 3D model (JSmol): Interactive image
- SMILES: O(C3c1ccccc1CCc2ccccc23)C4CCN(C)CC4

Hepzidine (INN) is a tricyclic antidepressant which was never marketed. It was first described by 1966.

== Synthesis ==
The synthesis has been described in the chemical literature:

The reduction of dibenzosuberone (1) gives dibenzosuberol [1210-34-0] (2). This alcohol forms ethers exceedingly easily, probably via the carbonium ion. Treatment with N-methyl-4-piperidinol [106-52-5] (3) in the presence of acid gives hepzidine (4).

== See also ==
- Diphenylpyraline is selfsame but is based on a benzhydrol aromatic pharmacophore.
- Dibenzosuberol is also used in the synthesis of Deptramine (DPH analog) as well as Oxitriptyline & Deptropine.
