= Diphenylmethane =

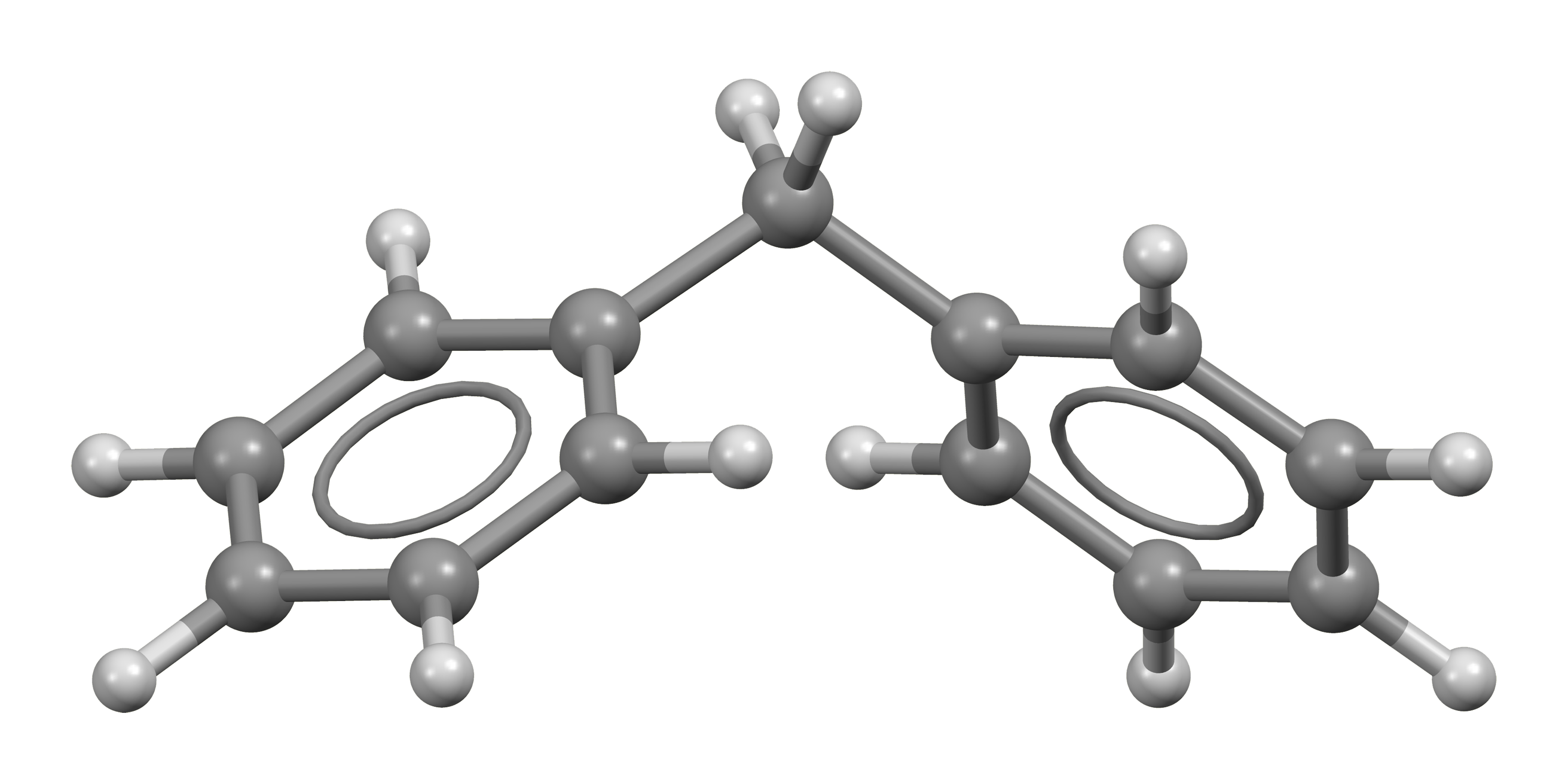

Names
- Preferred IUPAC name 1,1′-Methylenedibenzene
- Other names: Diphenylmethane; Benzylbenzene

Identifiers
CAS Number	101-81-5
3D model (JSmol)	Interactive image
Abbreviations	BnPh; Ph_{2}CH_{2}
ChEBI	CHEBI:38884
ChEMBL	ChEMBL1796022
ChemSpider	7299
ECHA InfoCard	100.002.708
MeSH	Diphenylmethane
PubChem CID	7580
UNII	K3E387I0BC
CompTox Dashboard (EPA)	DTXSID1041891
- InChI: InChI=1S/C13H12/c1-3-7-12(8-4-1)11-13-9-5-2-6-10-13/h1-10H,11H2 Key: CZZYITDELCSZES-UHFFFAOYSA-N; InChI=1/C13H12/c1-3-7-12(8-4-1)11-13-9-5-2-6-10-13/h1-10H,11H2 Key: CZZYITDELCSZES-UHFFFAOYAV
- SMILES: c1c(cccc1)Cc2ccccc2

Properties
Chemical formula	C_{13}H_{12}
Molar mass	168.239 g·mol^{−1}
Appearance	colourless oil
Density	1.006 g/mL
Melting point	22 to 24 °C (72 to 75 °F; 295 to 297 K)
Boiling point	264 °C (507 °F; 537 K)
Solubility in water	14 mg/L
Acidity (pK_{a})	32.2
Magnetic susceptibility (χ)	−115.7×10^{−6} cm^{3}/mol

Hazards
- Occupational safety and health (OHS/OSH)
Main hazards	flammable
Flash point	> 110 °C; 230 °F; 383 K

Related compounds
Related compounds	Diphenylmethanol
- Except where otherwise noted, data are given for materials in their standard state (at 25 °C [77 °F], 100 kPa). verify (what is ?) Infobox references

Diphenylmethane is an organic compound with the formula (C_{6}H_{5})_{2}CH_{2} (often abbreviated CH_{2}Ph_{2}). The compound consists of methane wherein two hydrogen atoms are replaced by two phenyl groups. It is a white solid.

Diphenylmethane is a common skeleton in organic chemistry. The diphenylmethyl group is also known as benzhydryl.

== Synthesis ==
It is prepared by the Friedel–Crafts alkylation of benzyl chloride with benzene in the presence of a Lewis acid such as aluminium chloride:

C_{6}H_{5}CH_{2}Cl + C_{6}H_{6} → (C_{6}H_{5})_{2}CH_{2} + HCl

== Reactivity of the C-H bond ==
The methylene group in diphenylmethane is mildly acidic with a pK_{a} of 32.2 in DMSO, and so can be deprotonated with sodium amide.

(C_{6}H_{5})_{2}CH_{2} + NaNH^{−}_{2} → (C_{6}H_{5})_{2}CHNa + NH_{3}

The resulting carbanion can be alkylated. For example, treatment with n-bromobutane produces 1,1-diphenylpentane in 92% yield.

(C_{6}H_{5})_{2}CH^{−} + CH_{3}CH_{2}CH_{2}CH_{2}Br → (C_{6}H_{5})_{2}CHCH_{2}CH_{2}CH_{2}CH_{3} + Br^{−}

Alkylation of various benzhydryl compounds has been demonstrated using the corresponding alkyl halides, both primary (benzyl chloride, β-phenylethyl chloride, and n-octyl bromide) and secondary (benzhydryl chloride, α-phenylethyl chloride, and isopropyl chloride), in yields between 86 and 99%.

The acidity of the methylene group in diphenylmethane is due to the weakness of the (C_{6}H_{5})_{2}CH−H, which has a bond dissociation energy (BDE) of 340 kJ/mol (82 kcal/mol). This is well below the published bond dissociation energies for comparable C−H bonds in propane, where the BDE of (CH_{3})_{2}CH−H is 413 kJ/mol (98.6 kcal/mol), and toluene, where the BDE of (C_{6}H_{4})CH_{2}−H is 375 kJ/mol (89.7 kcal/mol).

== See also ==
- Benzhydryl compounds
- Toluene (methylbenzene, phenylmethane)
- Triphenylmethane
- Tetraphenylmethane
