= Diphenylpyraline =

Chemical compound

Clinical data
- Other names: 4-(diphenylmethoxy)-1-methyl-piperidine
- AHFS/Drugs.com: International Drug Names
- Routes of administration: Oral, Topical
- ATC code: R06AA07 (WHO)

Legal status
- Legal status: In general: ℞ (Prescription only)

Pharmacokinetic data
- Elimination half-life: 24–40 hours

Identifiers
- IUPAC name: 4-benzhydryloxy-1-methyl-piperidine
- CAS Number: 147-20-6
- PubChem CID: 3103
- IUPHAR/BPS: 7165
- DrugBank: DB01146
- ChemSpider: 2992
- UNII: 33361OE3AV
- KEGG: D07862
- ChEBI: CHEBI:59788
- ChEMBL: ChEMBL1492
- CompTox Dashboard (EPA): DTXSID3022952
- ECHA InfoCard: 100.005.170

Chemical and physical data
- Formula: C_{19}H_{23}NO
- Molar mass: 281.399 g·mol^{−1}
- 3D model (JSmol): Interactive image
- SMILES: O(C(c1ccccc1)c2ccccc2)C3CCN(C)CC3
- InChI: InChI=1S/C19H23NO/c1-20-14-12-18(13-15-20)21-19(16-8-4-2-5-9-16)17-10-6-3-7-11-17/h2-11,18-19H,12-15H2,1H3; Key:OWQUZNMMYNAXSL-UHFFFAOYSA-N

Diphenylpyraline (DPP; sold as Allergen, Arbid, Belfene, Diafen, Hispril, Histyn, Lergobine, Lyssipol, Mepiben, Neargal) is a first-generation antihistamine with anticholinergic effects of the diphenylpiperidine class. It is marketed in Europe for the treatment of allergies. DPP has also been found to act as a dopamine reuptake inhibitor and produces hyperactivity in rodents. It has been shown to be useful in the treatment of Parkinsonism.

== Synthesis ==

Diphenylpyraline synthesis via coupling of benzhydrylbromide [776-74-9] (1) with 4-hydroxy-1-methylpiperidine [106-52-5] (2) by refluxing in xylene for 24 hours.

== See also ==
- Hepzidine is self-same but is instead based on a dibenzosuberone nucleus.
