= C21H25NO =

The molecular formula C_{21}H_{25}NO (molar mass: 307.429 g/mol) may refer to:

- Benzatropine, or benztropine
- Hepzidine
- 2β-Propanoyl-3β-(2-naphthyl)-tropane (or WF-23)
