= C18H18N2O =

The molecular formula C_{18}H_{18}N_{2}O (molar mass: 278.348 g/mol) may refer to:

- AC-262,536
- Demexiptiline
- Mariptiline
- Proquazone
