= Bromadryl =

Bromadryl may refer to:

- Phenmetrazine
- Embramine (antihistamine)
