= 10-Hydroxyketotifen =

Names
- Preferred IUPAC name 4-(1-Methylpiperidin-4-ylidene)-9,10-dihydro-4H-benzo[4,5]cyclohepta[1,2-b]thiophen-10-ol
- Other names 10-hydroxy-ketotifen, WR621365, NSC282481

Identifiers
CAS Number	43076-12-6
3D model (JSmol)	Interactive image
ChemSpider	286324
PubChem CID	323312
CompTox Dashboard (EPA)	DTXSID20314398
- InChI: InChI=1S/C19H21NOS/c1-20-9-6-13(7-10-20)18-15-5-3-2-4-14(15)12-17(21)19-16(18)8-11-22-19/h2-5,8,11,17,21H,6-7,9-10,12H2,1H3 Key: TZHJFZBFWVCFAA-UHFFFAOYSA-N
- SMILES: OC1c2c(/C(c3ccccc3C1)=C4CCN(CC\4)C)ccs2
- Except where otherwise noted, data are given for materials in their standard state (at 25 °C [77 °F], 100 kPa). Infobox references

10-Hydroxyketotifen (WR621365) is a biologically inactive metabolite of ketotifen. Despite the mainstream scientific consensus that 10-hydroxyketotifen is a biologically inactive compound, its pharmacological properties are not very well studied outside the context of ketotifen, therefore, 10-hydroxyketotifen may still possess biological activity similarly to norketotifen, another metabolite of ketotifen.

== Metabolic role ==
Ketotifen is an antihistamine medication which metabolizes to several compounds, including 10-hydroxyketotifen. Ketotifen, like other antihistamines, is mainly metabolized by the cytochrome P450 (CYP) enzymes, especially CYP3A4 in the liver. The CYP enzymes are responsible for the oxidation and demethylation of ketotifen, producing the major metabolites norketotifen and 10-hydroxyketotifen. Norketotifen is pharmacologically active and has a similar potency as ketotifen, while 10-hydroxyketotifen is inactive. The metabolites are then conjugated with glucuronic acid or sulfate and excreted in the urine and feces.

The definition and measurement of biological activity of drugs can be complex: biological activity is often defined in terms of the ability of a molecule to effect a change in a biological process, which can be quantified and measured in various ways; as such, even if 10-hydroxyketotifen is currently deemed inactive, it is possible that under certain conditions or within specific biological assays, some level of activity might be observed.
