= Benzocycloheptene =

Any organic compound with a cycloheptene ring fused with a benzene ring

Amitriptyline

Ketotifen

Benzocycloheptenes are cycloheptenes with additional benzene rings attached. Most have two benzene rings, and are called dibenzocycloheptenes.

Some benzocycloheptenes and substituted benzocycloheptenes have medical uses as antihistamines, anticholinergics, antidepressants, and antiserotonergics.

Examples include:

- Antihistamines and antiserotonergics
  - Azatadine
  - Desloratadine
  - Loratadine
  - Rupatadine
  - Cyproheptadine
  - Ketotifen
  - Pizotifen
- Anticholinergics
  - Deptropine
- Anticonvulsants
  - Oxitriptyline
- Antidepressants and anticholinergics
  - Amineptine
  - Amitriptyline
  - Nortriptyline
  - Noxiptyline
  - Octriptyline
  - Protriptyline
- Various
  - Cyclobenzaprine
  - Intriptyline

== See also ==
- Toll-like receptor 4 (TLR4) – investigating probable antagonistic (antiinflammatory) property of several TCA based molecules
