= C20H21N =

The molecular formula C_{20}H_{21}N (molar mass: 275.38 g/mol, exact mass: 275.1674 u) may refer to:

- Cyclobenzaprine (Flexeril)
- Octriptyline (SC-27,123)
