= Pridefine =

Chemical compound

Clinical data
- Routes of administration: Oral
- ATC code: none

Legal status
- Legal status: In general: uncontrolled

Identifiers
- IUPAC name: 3-(Diphenylmethylidene)-1-ethylpyrrolidine
- CAS Number: 5370-41-2
- PubChem CID: 31740
- ChemSpider: 29434
- UNII: W0394470AX
- CompTox Dashboard (EPA): DTXSID30201962

Chemical and physical data
- Formula: C_{19}H_{21}N
- Molar mass: 263.384 g·mol^{−1}

Pridefine (AHR-1,118) is a drug which was investigated as an antidepressant in the late 1970s and early 1980s, but was never marketed. It acts as a balanced reuptake inhibitor of serotonin, dopamine, and norepinephrine, and also has some weak releasing activity.

In clinical trials pridefine was found to be as efficacious as the tricyclic antidepressants amitriptyline and imipramine in the treatment of major depressive disorder but was much more tolerable in comparison and also had an earlier onset of action. It has been shown to be effective in the treatment of alcoholism as well.

== See also ==
- Desoxypipradrol
- Diphenylprolinol
- Etifelmine
- Pipradrol
- Piroheptine
