= Cyheptamide =

Anticonvulsant compound made from dibenzosuberone

Clinical data
- Other names: Cyheptamine

Identifiers
- IUPAC name: tricyclo[9.4.0.03,8]pentadeca-1(15),3,5,7,11,13-hexaene-2-carboxamide
- CAS Number: 7199-29-3
- PubChem CID: 23603
- ChemSpider: 22071
- UNII: 6R22P8K61P
- KEGG: D03628
- ChEMBL: ChEMBL1868301
- CompTox Dashboard (EPA): DTXSID6046551
- ECHA InfoCard: 100.027.792

Chemical and physical data
- Formula: C_{16}H_{15}NO
- Molar mass: 237.302 g·mol^{−1}
- 3D model (JSmol): Interactive image
- SMILES: C1CC2=CC=CC=C2C(C3=CC=CC=C31)C(=O)N
- InChI: InChI=1S/C16H15NO/c17-16(18)15-13-7-3-1-5-11(13)9-10-12-6-2-4-8-14(12)15/h1-8,15H,9-10H2,(H2,17,18); Key:APBVLLORZMAWKI-UHFFFAOYSA-N

Cyheptamide was a investigational new drug that was developed by Ayerst Research Laboratories in the 1960s and was evaluated as an anticonvulsant.

Cyheptamide undergoes significant metabolic transformation in both animals and humans, primarily through hydroxylation pathways.

Cyheptamide exhibits moderate acute toxicity in animal models, with species-specific variations in lethal dose values.

== Related compounds ==
SGB-017 has a similar chemical structure and has also been evaluated for its potential use as an anticonvulsant.

Chemical structure of SGB-017

== See also ==
- Citenamide
