= Sulforidazine =

Typical antipsychotic medication

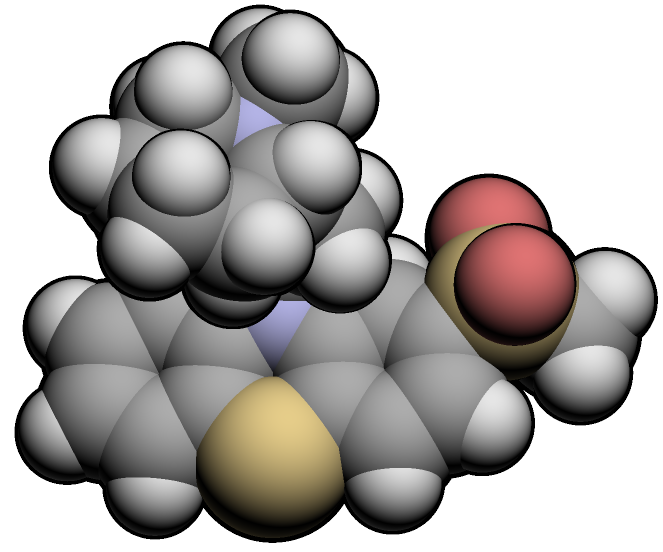

Clinical data
- ATC code: none

Identifiers
- IUPAC name: 10-{2-[(RS)-1-Methylpiperidin-2-yl]ethyl}-2-(methylsulfonyl)-10H-phenothiazine
- CAS Number: 14759-06-9
- PubChem CID: 31765
- ChemSpider: 29458
- UNII: B7599I244X
- ChEBI: CHEBI:135644
- ChEMBL: ChEMBL2107268
- CompTox Dashboard (EPA): DTXSID30864531
- ECHA InfoCard: 100.035.274

Chemical and physical data
- Formula: C_{21}H_{26}N_{2}O_{2}S_{2}
- Molar mass: 402.57 g·mol^{−1}
- 3D model (JSmol): Interactive image
- SMILES: O=S(=O)(c2cc1N(c3c(Sc1cc2)cccc3)CCC4N(C)CCCC4)C
- InChI: InChI=1S/C21H26N2O2S2/c1-22-13-6-5-7-16(22)12-14-23-18-8-3-4-9-20(18)26-21-11-10-17(15-19(21)23)27(2,24)25/h3-4,8-11,15-16H,5-7,12-14H2,1-2H3; Key:FLGCRGJDQJIJAW-UHFFFAOYSA-N

Sulforidazine (Imagotan, Psychoson, Inofal) a typical antipsychotic and a metabolite of thioridazine; it and mesoridazine are more potent than the parent compound, whose pharmacological effects are believed by some to be largely due to its metabolism into sulforidazine and mesoridazine.

== Synthesis ==
Synthesis of sulforidazine

Sulforidazine can be synthesized starting 2-bromo-2'-amino-4'-methylsulfonyl-diphenyl sulfide (1). Acetylation produces 2-bromo-2'-acetamino-4'-methylsulphonyl diphenylsulfide (2), which is then alkylated with 2-(2-chloroethyl)-1-methylpiperidine (3). Deacylation followed by a copper-catalyzed ring-formation reaction produces sulforidazine.
