= Piroheptine =

Chemical compound

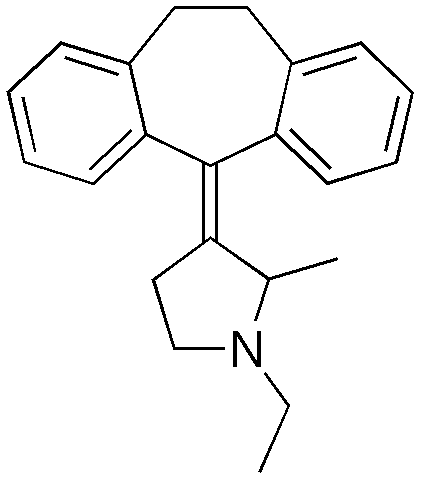

Clinical data
- AHFS/Drugs.com: International Drug Names
- Routes of administration: Oral
- ATC code: none

Legal status
- Legal status: In general: ℞ (Prescription only)

Identifiers
- IUPAC name: 3-(10,11-dihydro-5H-dibenzo[a,d][7]annulen-5-ylidene)-1-ethyl-2-methylpyrrolidine
- CAS Number: 16378-21-5; HCl: 16378-22-6
- PubChem CID: 4854
- ChemSpider: 4688
- UNII: AR6Y753ARL; HCl: 4ZM573199N
- KEGG: D01231
- ChEBI: CHEBI:135287
- CompTox Dashboard (EPA): DTXSID30864672

Chemical and physical data
- Formula: C_{22}H_{25}N
- Molar mass: 303.449 g·mol^{−1}
- 3D model (JSmol): Interactive image
- SMILES: CCN1CCC(=C2C3=CC=CC=C3CCC4=CC=CC=C42)C1C
- InChI: InChI=1S/C22H25N/c1-3-23-15-14-19(16(23)2)22-20-10-6-4-8-17(20)12-13-18-9-5-7-11-21(18)22/h4-11,16H,3,12-15H2,1-2H3; Key:NKJQZSDCCLDOQH-UHFFFAOYSA-N

Piroheptine (brand name Trimol) is an anticholinergic and antihistamine used as an antiparkinsonian agent.

Piroheptine was observed to prevent the reuptake of dopamine and is therefore a DRI.

Piroheptine comes from a family of drugs that includes pridefine and etifelmine.

== Synthesis ==

Piroheptine can be synthesized starting from 5-(3-bromopropylidene)-10,11-dihydro-5H-dibenzo[a,d]cycloheptene (1) and acetonitrile which react via catalysis by stannic chloride (SnCl_{4}) to give 2-methyl-3-(10,11-dihydro-5H-dibenzo[a,d] cycloheptene-5-ylidene)-1-pyrroline (2). Quaternization of the product with ethyl iodide affords the alkyl immonium ion (3). Reduction of the Schiff base with sodium borohydride then affords the product, piroheptine (4).
