= Intriptyline =

Chemical compound

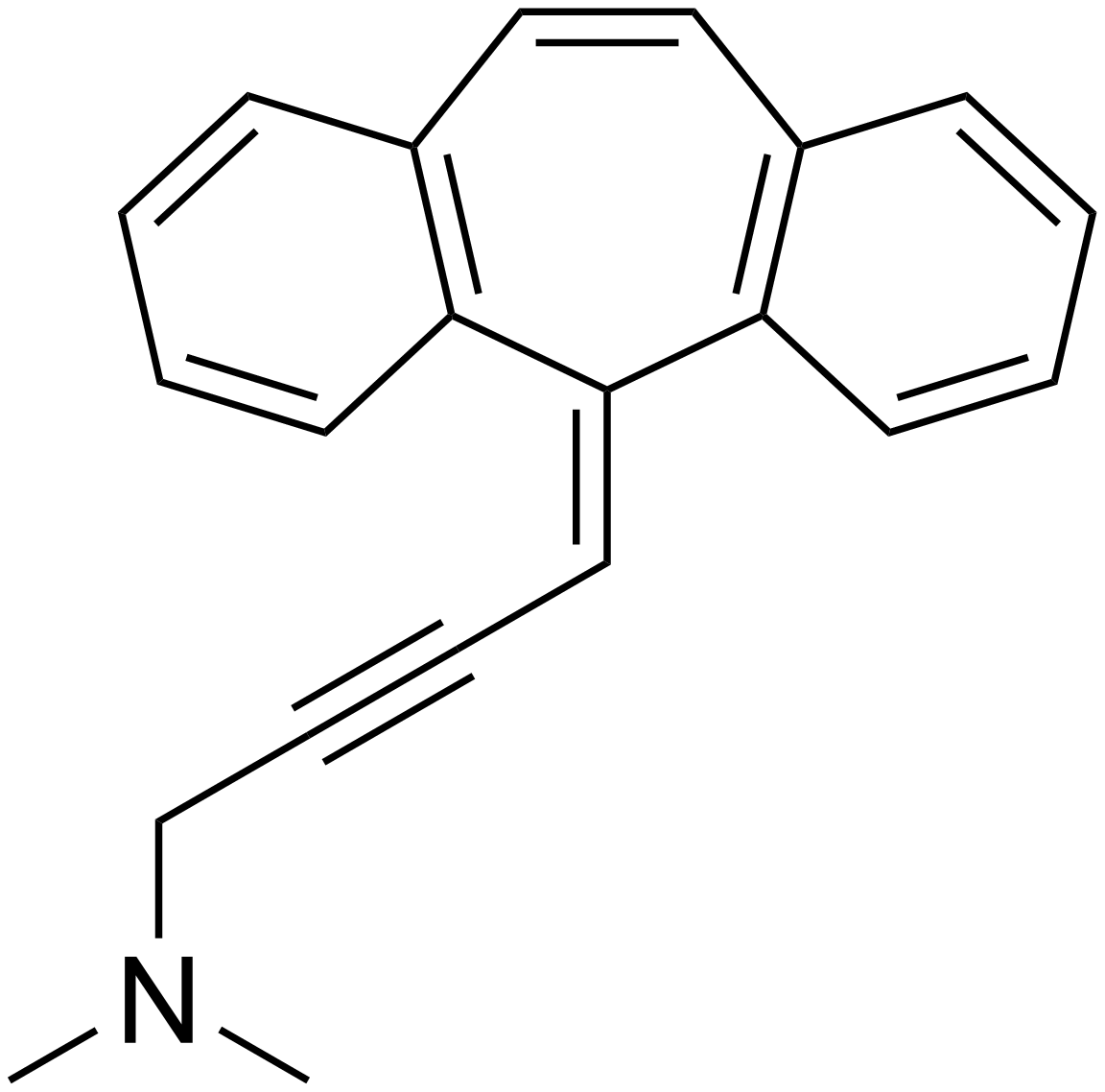

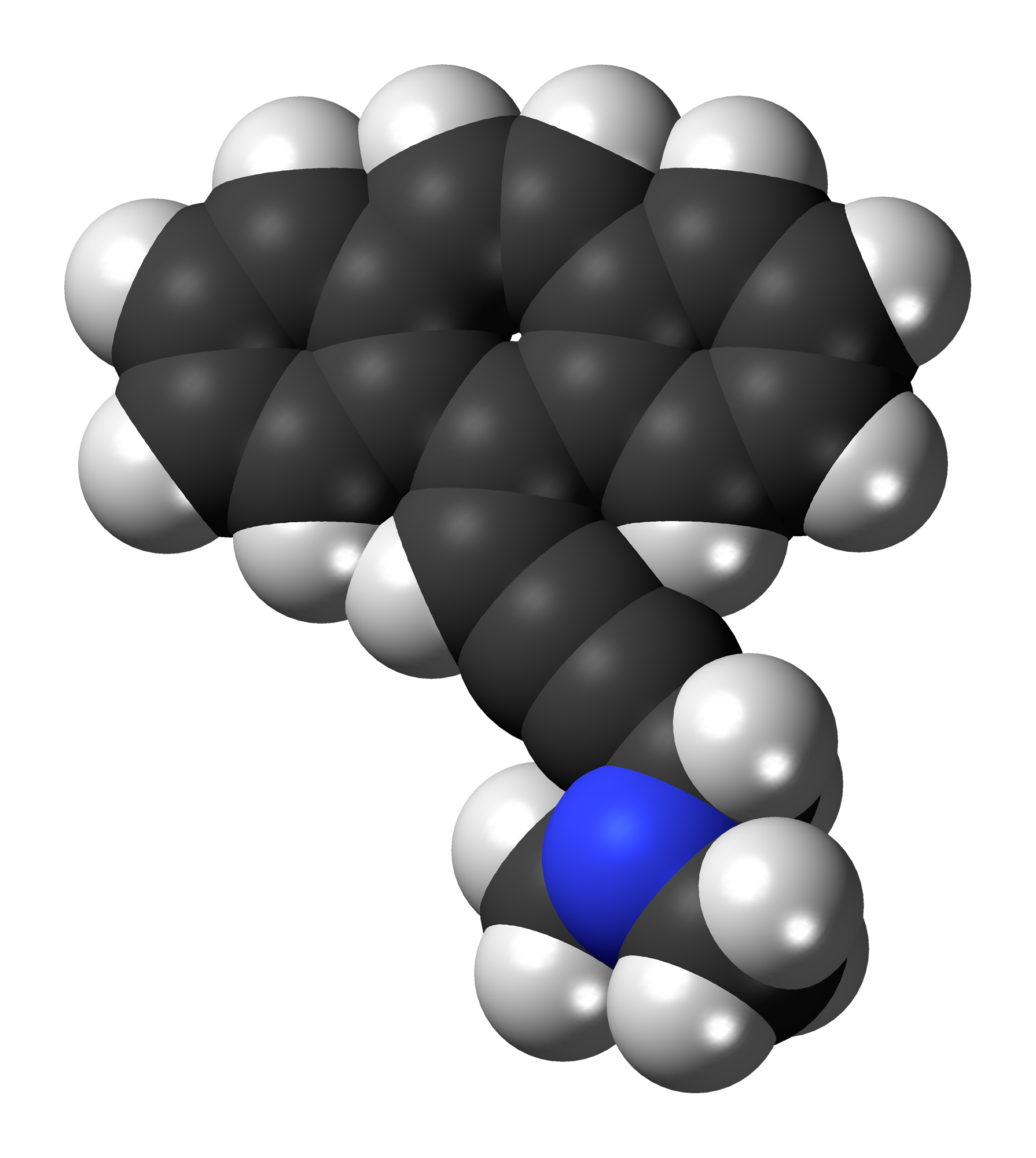

Clinical data
- ATC code: none

Identifiers
- IUPAC name: N,N-dimethyl-4-(2-tricyclo[9.4.0.03,8]pentadeca-1(15),3,5,7,9,11,13-heptaenylidene)but-2-yn-1-amine
- CAS Number: 27466-27-9
- PubChem CID: 71397
- ChemSpider: 64489
- UNII: GU9MLT8VE0
- ChEMBL: ChEMBL2110677
- CompTox Dashboard (EPA): DTXSID20181885

Chemical and physical data
- Formula: C_{21}H_{19}N
- Molar mass: 285.390 g·mol^{−1}
- 3D model (JSmol): Interactive image
- SMILES: C(#C\C=C3/c1ccccc1\C=C/c2c3cccc2)CN(C)C
- InChI: InChI=1S/C21H19N/c1-22(2)16-8-7-13-21-19-11-5-3-9-17(19)14-15-18-10-4-6-12-20(18)21/h3-6,9-15H,16H2,1-2H3; Key:OKCODFSHDQKCQN-UHFFFAOYSA-N

Intriptyline is a tricyclic antidepressant (TCA) that was never marketed.

== See also ==
- Benzocycloheptenes
- Cyclobenzaprine
- Tricyclic antidepressant
