= Butaclamol =

Chemical compound

Clinical data
- ATC code: none

Identifiers
- IUPAC name: (3S,4aS,13bS)-3-(2-Methyl-2-propanyl)-2,3,4,4a,8,9,13b,14-octahydro-1H-benzo[6,7]cyclohepta[1,2,3-de]pyrido[2,1-a]isoquinolin-3-ol
- CAS Number: 36504-93-5
- PubChem CID: 37459
- IUPHAR/BPS: 62
- ChemSpider: 34364
- UNII: A7A2802VNL
- ChEBI: CHEBI:73298
- ChEMBL: ChEMBL479587
- CompTox Dashboard (EPA): DTXSID701317857 DTXSID5048429, DTXSID701317857

Chemical and physical data
- Formula: C_{25}H_{31}NO
- Molar mass: 361.529 g·mol^{−1}
- 3D model (JSmol): Interactive image
- SMILES: CC(C)(C)C1(CCN2CC3C4=CC=CC=C4CCC5=C3C(=CC=C5)C2C1)O

Butaclamol (AY-23,028) is a type of antipsychotic which was never marketed. Sold as the hydrochloride salt for use in research, the compound acts as a dopamine receptor antagonist.

== Discussion ==
pK_{a} = 7.15 (uncorrected for ionic strength)

McN-4171 is an analog of butaclamol. McN-4612-Y is also described in the attached article. This is similar to McN 4612-z except it is the opposite optical antipode. It is therefore supposedly an antipsychotic.

== Synthesis ==
The synthesis has been reported: Patent:

- The starting material is made by a Favorskii reaction of dibenzosuberone with acetylene followed by a Meyer–Schuster rearrangement to the aldehyde and oxidation to the acid. Another method is Reformatsky reaction with bromoethylacetate and catalytic hydrogenation of the olefin in the ester that follows dehydration.
- The starting material is called 10,11-Dihydro-5H-dibenzo-[a,d]cycloheptene-5-acetic acid, PC12669091 (1). FGI by any of a number of methods to the isocyanate (NCO) gives (2). Addition of one equivalent of water gives N-formyl-10,11-dihydro-5H-dibenzo(a,d)cycloheptene-5-methylamine (3). Cyclization gives 1,7,8,12b-tetrahydrobenzo(6,7)cyclohept(1,2,3-de)isoquinoline [7574-72-3] (4). A modified Robinson annulation with methylvinylketone gave PC21397166 (5).

== See also ==
- Dexclamol
