= Dinoxyline =

Chemical compound

Clinical data
- ATC code: none

Identifiers
- IUPAC name: 8,9-dihydroxy-1,2,3,11b-tetrahydrochromeno[4,3,2,-de]isoquinoline
- CAS Number: 757176-96-8
- PubChem CID: 9819126
- ChemSpider: 7994875
- UNII: 9T7B8CV47A
- CompTox Dashboard (EPA): DTXSID801028590

Chemical and physical data
- Formula: C_{15}H_{13}NO_{3}
- Molar mass: 255.273 g·mol^{−1}
- 3D model (JSmol): Interactive image
- SMILES: c3ccc(Oc24)c1c3CNCC1c4ccc(O)c2O
- InChI: InChI=1S/C15H13NO3/c17-11-5-4-9-10-7-16-6-8-2-1-3-12(13(8)10)19-15(9)14(11)18/h1-5,10,16-18H,6-7H2; Key:QOHSTVKJXZTEOL-UHFFFAOYSA-N

Dinoxyline is a synthetic compound developed for scientific research, which acts as a potent full agonist at all five dopamine receptor subtypes.
