= Benzylpenicilloyl polylysine =

Chemical compound

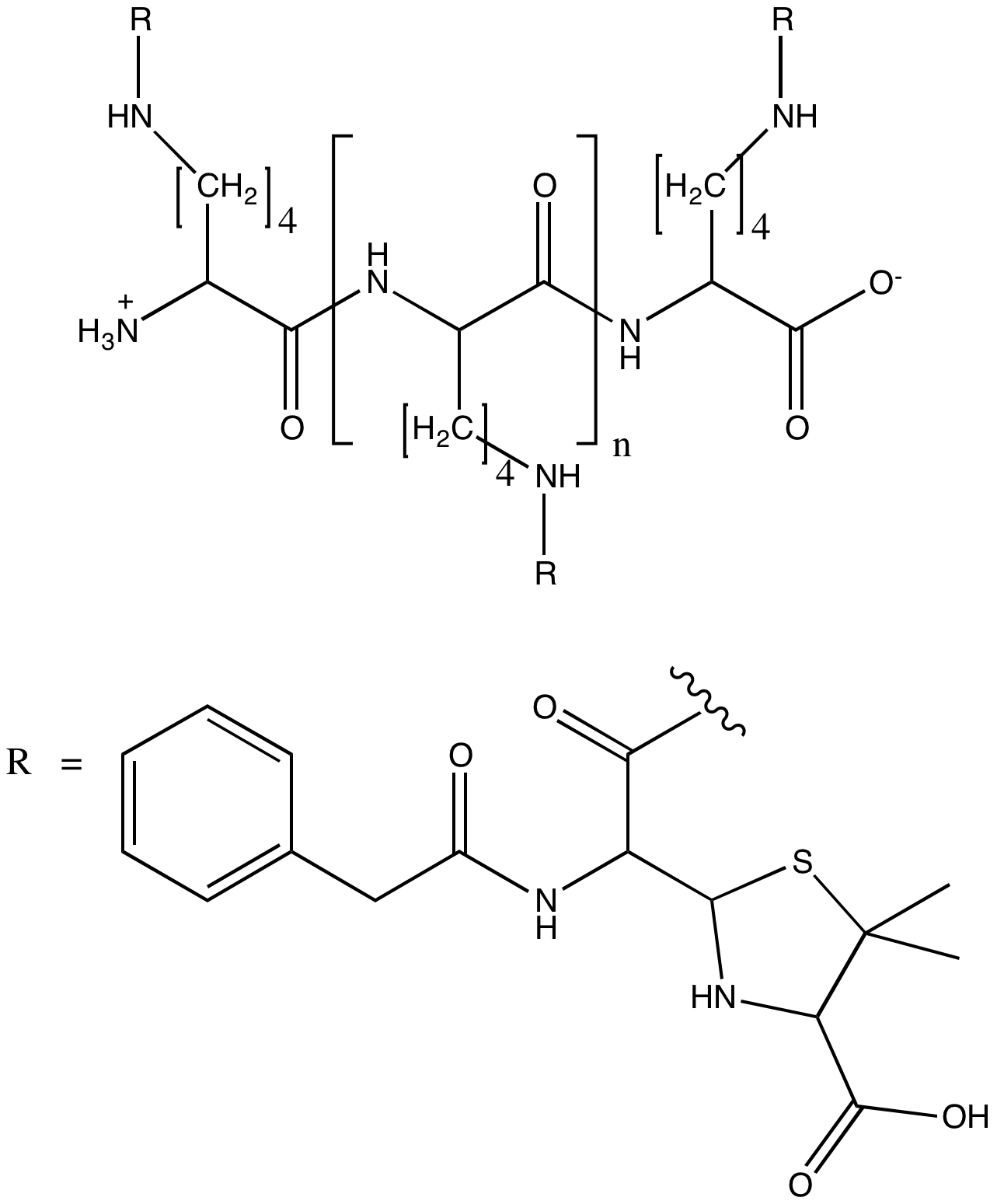

Clinical data
- Trade names: Pre-Pen
- Other names: Pre-Pen
- License data: US FDA: Pre-Pen
- Routes of administration: Liquid intradermal
- ATC code: none

Legal status
- Legal status: US: ℞-only

Identifiers
- IUPAC name: [2S-(2α,5α,6β)]-3,3-dimethyl-7-oxo-6-[(2-phenylacetyl)amino]-4-thia-1-azabicyclo[3.2.0]heptane-2-carboxylate : L-Lysine homopolymer
- CAS Number: 31855-75-1
- DrugBank: DB00895
- ChemSpider: none
- UNII: 76479814OY
- ChEMBL: ChEMBL1201779
- CompTox Dashboard (EPA): DTXSID00185720

Benzylpenicilloyl polylysine (Pre-Pen) is used as a skin test before the administration of penicillin. It is used to detect the immunoglobulin E antibodies. The chemical structure consists of the benzylpenicilloyl group attached to a polymer of L-lysine.
