= Diphenylmethanol =

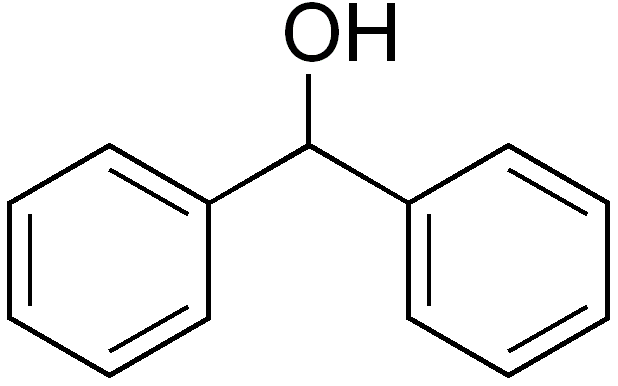
- Diphenylmethanol

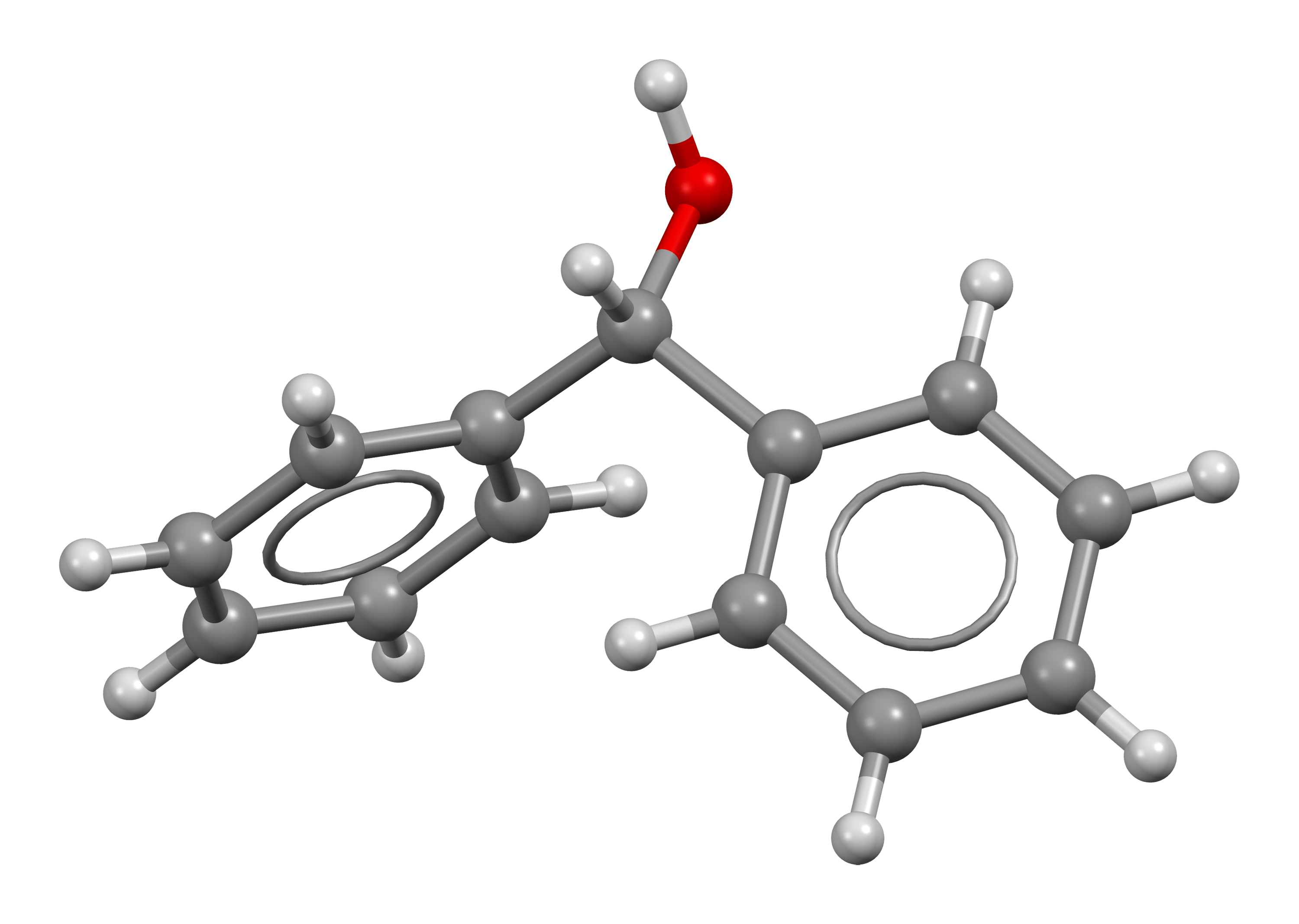

Names
- Preferred IUPAC name Diphenylmethanol
- Other names Benzhydrol; Diphenylcarbinol; Hydroxydiphenylmethane

Identifiers
CAS Number	91-01-0
3D model (JSmol)	Interactive image
ChEBI	CHEBI:156087
ChemSpider	6770
ECHA InfoCard	100.001.849
EC Number	202-033-8
PubChem CID	7037
UNII	S4HQ1H8OWD
CompTox Dashboard (EPA)	DTXSID2059015
- InChI: InChI=1S/C13H12O/c14-13(11-7-3-1-4-8-11)12-9-5-2-6-10-12/h1-10,13-14H Key: QILSFLSDHQAZET-UHFFFAOYSA-N; InChI=1/C13H12O/c14-13(11-7-3-1-4-8-11)12-9-5-2-6-10-12/h1-10,13-14H Key: QILSFLSDHQAZET-UHFFFAOYAG
- SMILES: OC(c1ccccc1)c2ccccc2

Properties
Chemical formula	C_{13}H_{12}O
Molar mass	184.238 g·mol^{−1}
Appearance	White crystals
Density	1.103 g/cm^{3}
Melting point	69 °C (156 °F; 342 K)
Boiling point	298 °C (568 °F; 571 K)
Solubility in water	0.5 g/L (20 °C)
Magnetic susceptibility (χ)	−119.1·10^{−6} cm^{3}/mol

Hazards
- GHS labelling
Pictograms	(GHS07: Exclamation mark)
Signal word	Warning
Hazard statements	H315, H319, H335
Precautionary statements	P261, P264, P271, P280, P302+P352, P304+P340, P305+P351+P338, P312, P321, P332+P313, P337+P313, P362, P403+P233, P405, P501

Related compounds
Related compounds	Benzophenone
- Except where otherwise noted, data are given for materials in their standard state (at 25 °C [77 °F], 100 kPa). verify (what is ?) Infobox references

Diphenylmethanol is the organic compound with the formula (C_{6}H_{5})_{2}CHOH. Also known as benzhydrol, it is a white solid and the parent member of a large class of diaryl alcohols.

== Preparation ==
Diphenylmethanol may be prepared by a Grignard reaction between phenylmagnesium bromide and benzaldehyde. An alternative method involves reducing benzophenone with sodium borohydride or with zinc dust or with sodium amalgam and water.

== Uses and safety ==
It has uses in perfume and pharmaceutical manufacture. In perfumery it is used as a fixative. In pharmaceutical manufacture it is used in the synthesis of antihistamines / antiallergenic agents and antihypertensive agents . It is used in the synthesis of modafinil and the benzhydryl group is present in the structure of many histamine H1 antagonists like diphenylhydramine. Benzhydrol is also used in the production of agrochemicals as well as other organic compounds and as a terminating group in polymerizations.

Diphenylmethanol is an irritant to the eyes, skin and respiratory system.
