= Dexclamol =

Antipsychotic compound

Clinical data
- Other names: AY 24169

Identifiers
- IUPAC name: (1R,6R,8R)-6-propan-2-yl-3-azapentacyclo[11.8.1.03,8.09,22.016,21]docosa-9,11,13(22),16,18,20-hexaen-6-ol
- CAS Number: 52340-25-7 HCl: 52389-27-2
- PubChem CID: 91267
- ChemSpider: 16736937
- UNII: IGL2M625XH
- ChEMBL: ChEMBL320656
- CompTox Dashboard (EPA): DTXSID001023746

Chemical and physical data
- Formula: C_{24}H_{29}NO
- Molar mass: 347.502 g·mol^{−1}
- 3D model (JSmol): Interactive image
- SMILES: CC(C)[C@]1(CCN2C[C@@H]3C4=CC=CC=C4CCC5=C3C(=CC=C5)[C@H]2C1)O
- InChI: InChI=1S/C24H29NO/c1-16(2)24(26)12-13-25-15-21-19-8-4-3-6-17(19)10-11-18-7-5-9-20(23(18)21)22(25)14-24/h3-9,16,21-22,26H,10-15H2,1-2H3/t21-,22-,24-/m1/s1; Key:UPMOVJBGNREKJV-CQOQZXRMSA-N

Dexclamol (AY 24169) was an investigational new drug developed by McKenna and Harrison, Ltd. that was evaluated as a antipsychotic. It acts as a dopamine receptor antagonist.

== See also ==
- Butaclamol
