= Norketotifen =

Identifiers
CAS Number	34580-20-6
3D model (JSmol)	Interactive image
ChEBI	CHEBI:174806
ChEMBL	ChEMBL1197564
ChemSpider	8079890
EC Number	806-081-6
PubChem CID	9904236
UNII	Z24BD2IFB3
- InChI: InChI=1S/C18H17NOS/c20-16-11-13-3-1-2-4-14(13)17(12-5-8-19-9-6-12)15-7-10-21-18(15)16/h1-4,7,10,19H,5-6,8-9,11H2 Key: IYSYPCSSDZBWHN-UHFFFAOYSA-N
- SMILES: C1CNCCC1=C2C3=C(C(=O)CC4=CC=CC=C42)SC=C3

Properties
Chemical formula	C_{18}H_{17}NOS
Molar mass	295.4
- Except where otherwise noted, data are given for materials in their standard state (at 25 °C [77 °F], 100 kPa). Infobox references

Norketotifen is a pharmaceutical medication under research, which is not yet approved for use. It is undergoing clinical trials. Norketotifen is a biologically active demethylated metabolite of ketotifen and has a similar potency as ketotifen as an antihistamine H_{1} medication and a mast cell stabilizer, yet is likely devoid of sedative effects of ketotifen, potentially allowing for higher doses to be administered without sedation as a limiting factor. Norketotifen is researched for its potential anti-inflammatory activity caused by dose-dependent inhibition of the release of the pro-inflammatory cytokine TNF-α, and for its other potential properties.

== Pharmaceutical properties ==
Norketotifen is a metabolite of ketotifen which was patented in 1970 by Sandoz Pharmaceuticals (currently a part of Novartis), a Swiss company, and came into medical use in 1976. Some authors think that ketotifen can be considered a sedating (sleepiness-causing) prodrug that is converted to norketotifen, a nonsedating metabolite with anti-inflammatory properties. These authors view norketotifen as a potential anti-inflammatory medication.

== Research directions ==
=== Influenza ===
The potential future applications of norketotifen, including a treatment for non-complicated influenza are researched by Emergo Therapeutics, a US company.

=== Malaria ===
Norketotifen has shown potential as an antimalarial drug, but the research is in the very early stage. Norketotifen has been found to be a more potent antimalarial in vitro compared to ketotifen, and it exhibited equivalent activity in vivo against asexual blood and developing liver-stage parasites. After ketotifen dosing, norketotifen levels were much higher than ketotifen relative to the IC50s (half-minimal inhibitory concentration) of the compounds against Plasmodium falciparum in vitro. This suggests that the antimalarial activity of ketotifen in mice is mediated through norketotifen. Given these findings, future research could focus on further understanding the pharmacokinetics and metabolism of norketotifen, as well as its mechanism of action against Plasmodium falciparum. It would also be beneficial to investigate the drug's efficacy against other strains of Plasmodium and in different animal models. If norketotifen continues to show promising results in future studies, it could potentially be developed into a new antimalarial drug. This could be particularly valuable given the increasing resistance of malaria parasites to existing drugs.

=== Sedation ===
Both ketotifen and its active metabolite norketotifen exist as optically active atropisomers. They both have antihistaminic and anti-inflammatory properties. However, the S-atropisomer of norketotifen (SN) causes less sedation than ketotifen and the R-atropisomer of norketotifen (RN) in rodents. The lower sedative effect of SN in rodents is probably due to a combination of a lower uptake of norketotifen than ketotifen into the brain and less affinity of SN for histamine H_{1} receptors in the central nervous system. This research direction could potentially lead to the development of antihistamines with reduced sedative effects.
