= Clocinizine =

Chemical compound

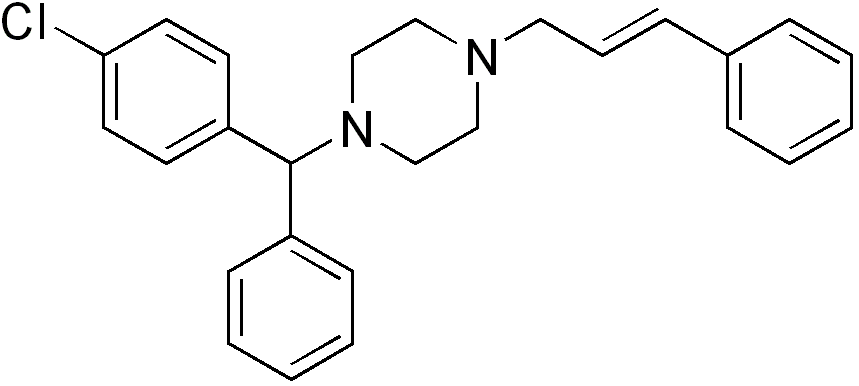

Clinical data
- Trade names: Senioral (with PPA)
- AHFS/Drugs.com: International Drug Names
- Routes of administration: By mouth
- ATC code: none

Identifiers
- IUPAC name: 1-[(4-chlorophenyl)-phenylmethyl]-4-[(E)-3-phenylprop-2-enyl]piperazine
- CAS Number: 298-55-5
- PubChem CID: 5375618
- ChemSpider: 4525064
- UNII: 8HQJ711KH8
- ChEMBL: ChEMBL2104069

Chemical and physical data
- Formula: C_{26}H_{27}ClN_{2}
- Molar mass: 402.97 g·mol^{−1}
- 3D model (JSmol): Interactive image
- SMILES: Clc1ccc(cc1)C(c2ccccc2)N3CCN(CC3)C\C=C\c4ccccc4

Clocinizine is a first-generation antihistamine of the diphenylmethylpiperazine class. It is marketed in Spain in combination with phenylpropanolamine under the brand name Senioral.

== Synthesis ==
Synthesis: Patent:

The reduction of 4-Chlorobenzophenone [134-85-0] (1) with NBH gives 4-Chlorobenzhydrol [119-56-2] (2). Halogenation of the alcohol in muriatic acid afforded 4-Chlorobenzhydryl chloride [134-83-8] (3). Alkylation with one equivalent of piperazine gives 1-(4-Chlorobenzhydryl)piperazine [303-26-4] (4). Alkylation of the remaining nitrogen with Cinnamyl Bromide [4392-24-9] (5) completed the synthesis of Clocinizine (6).
