= Thioridazine =

First generation antipsychotic medication

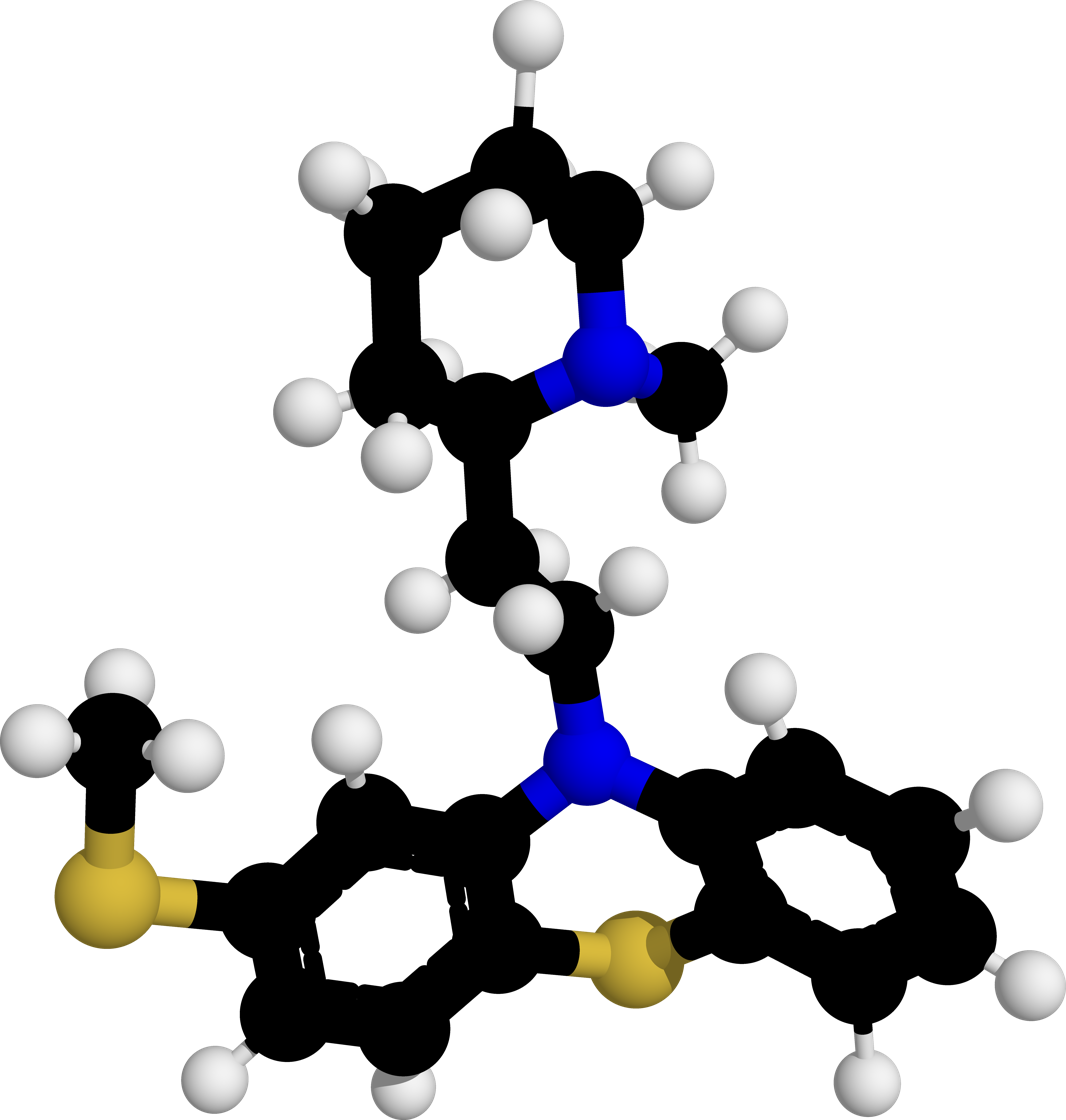

Clinical data
- AHFS/Drugs.com: Professional Drug Facts
- MedlinePlus: a682119
- License data: US DailyMed: Thioridazine; US FDA: Thioridazine
- Pregnancy category: AU: C
- Routes of administration: Oral
- Drug class: Typical antipsychotic
- ATC code: N05AC02 (WHO)

Legal status
- Legal status: BR: Class C1 (Other controlled substances); Withdrawn by the manufacturer worldwide; generic formulations are still available by prescription

Pharmacokinetic data
- Bioavailability: Incomplete
- Metabolism: Hepatic (at least partly mediated by CYP2D6)
- Elimination half-life: 21–24 hours
- Excretion: Feces

Identifiers
- IUPAC name: 10-{2-[(RS)-1-Methylpiperidin-2-yl]ethyl}- 2-methylsulfanylphenothiazine
- CAS Number: 50-52-2
- PubChem CID: 5452
- PubChem SID: 148555
- IUPHAR/BPS: 100
- DrugBank: DB00679
- ChemSpider: 5253
- UNII: N3D6TG58NI
- KEGG: D00373
- ChEBI: CHEBI:9566
- ChEMBL: ChEMBL479
- CompTox Dashboard (EPA): DTXSID6023656
- ECHA InfoCard: 100.000.041

Chemical and physical data
- Formula: C_{21}H_{26}N_{2}S_{2}
- Molar mass: 370.57 g·mol^{−1}
- 3D model (JSmol): Interactive image
- SMILES: S(c2cc1N(c3c(Sc1cc2)cccc3)CCC4N(C)CCCC4)C
- InChI: InChI=1S/C21H26N2S2/c1-22-13-6-5-7-16(22)12-14-23-18-8-3-4-9-20(18)25-21-11-10-17(24-2)15-19(21)23/h3-4,8-11,15-16H,5-7,12-14H2,1-2H3; Key:KLBQZWRITKRQQV-UHFFFAOYSA-N

Thioridazine (sold under the brand names Mellaril or Melleril) is a first-generation antipsychotic drug belonging to the phenothiazine drug group. It was previously widely used in the treatment of schizophrenia and psychosis. The branded product was withdrawn worldwide in 2005 because it caused severe cardiac arrhythmias. However, generic versions are still available in the United States.

== Indications ==
Its primary use in medicine is for the treatment of schizophrenia. It was also tried with some success as a treatment for various psychiatric symptoms seen in people with dementia, but chronic use of thioridazine and other anti-psychotics in people with dementia is not recommended.

== Side effects ==
Thioridazine prolongs the QTc interval in a dose-dependent manner. It produces significantly less extrapyramidal side effects than most first-generation antipsychotics, likely due to its potent anticholinergic effect. Its use, along with the use of other typical antipsychotics, has been associated with degenerative retinopathies (specifically retinitis pigmentosa). It has a higher propensity for causing anticholinergic side effects coupled with a lower propensity for causing extrapyramidal side effects and sedation than chlorpromazine, but also has a higher incidence of hypotension and cardiotoxicity. It is also known to possess a relatively high liability for causing orthostatic hypotension compared to other antipsychotics. Similarly to other first-generation antipsychotics it has a relatively high liability for causing prolactin elevation. It is moderate risk for causing weight gain. As with all antipsychotics thioridazine has been linked to cases of tardive dyskinesia (an often permanent neurological disorder characterised by slow, repetitive, purposeless and involuntary movements, most often of the facial muscles, that is usually brought on by years of continued treatment with antipsychotics, especially the first-generation (or typical) antipsychotics such as thioridazine) and neuroleptic malignant syndrome (a potentially fatal complication of antipsychotic treatment). Blood dyscrasias such as agranulocytosis, leukopenia and neutropenia are possible with thioridazine treatment. Thioridazine is also associated with abnormal retinal pigmentation after many years of use. Thioridazine has been correlated to rare instances of clinically apparent acute cholestatic liver injury.

== Pharmacology ==
Thioridazine has the following binding profile:

Biologic Protein	Binding affinity (K_{i}[nM])	Binding affinity of Mesoridazine (K_{i} [nM])	Binding affinity of Sulforidazine (K_{i} [nM])	Notes
SERT	1259	ND	ND	
NET	842	ND	ND	
DAT	1684	ND	ND	
5-HT_{1A}	144.35	500 (HB)	ND	
5-HT_{1B}	109	ND	ND	
5-HT_{1D}	579	ND	ND	
5-HT_{1E}	194	ND	ND	
5-HT_{2A}	27.67	4.76 (HB)	ND	The ratio of 5-HT2A to D2 receptor binding is believed to dictate whether or not most antipsychotics are atypical or typical. In thioridazine's case its ratio of 5-HT2A to D2 receptor binding is below the level that's believed to be required for atypicality despite its relatively low extrapyramidal side effect liability in practice.
5-HT_{2C}	53	157	ND	Believed to play a role in the weight gain-promoting effects of antipsychotics.
5-HT_{3}	>10000	ND	ND	
5-HT_{5A}	364	ND	ND	
5-HT_{6}	57.05	380	ND	
5-HT_{7}	99	73 (RC)	ND	
α_{1A}	3.15	2 (HB)	ND	Likely the receptor responsible for the orthostatic hypotension known to occur in individuals on thioridazine.
α_{1B}	2.4	ND	ND	
α_{2A}	134.15	1612.9 (HB)	ND	
α_{2B}	341.65	ND	ND	
α_{2C}	74.9	ND	ND	
β_{1}	>10000	ND	ND	
β_{2}	>10000	ND	ND	
M_{1}	12.8	10	ND	This receptor is believed to be the chief receptor responsible for the anticholinergic side effects of thioridazine (e.g. dry mouth, constipation, blurred vision, etc.). Likely plays a role in thioridazine's low extrapyramidal side effect liability as anticholinergic drugs such as benzatropine are routinely given to treat extrapyramidal side effects resulting from antipsychotic treatment.
M_{2}	286.33	15	ND	
M_{3}	29	90	ND	
M_{4}	310.33	19	ND	
M_{5}	12.67	60	ND	
D_{1}	94.5	ND	ND	
D_{2}	0.4	4.3	0.25	Believed to be the receptor responsible for the therapeutic effects of antipsychotics.
D_{3}	1.5	2.6	0.7	
D_{4}	1.5	9.1	ND	
D_{5}	258	ND	ND	
hERG	191	ND	ND	Likely involved in thioridazine's cardiac effects.
H_{1}	16.5	1.81 (HB)	ND	Likely responsible for the sedating effects of thioridazine.
H_{2}	136	ND	ND	Regulates the release of hydrochloric acid into the stomach.
H_{4}	2400	ND	ND	

Note: The Binding affinities given are towards cloned human receptors unless otherwise specified

Acronyms used
HB – Human brain receptor
RC – Cloned rat receptor
ND – No data

== Metabolism ==
Thioridazine is a racemic compound with two enantiomers, both of which are metabolized, according to Eap et al., by CYP2D6 into (S)- and (R)-thioridazine-2-sulfoxide, better known as mesoridazine, and into (S)- and (R)-thioridazine-5-sulfoxide. Mesoridazine is in turn metabolized into sulforidazine. Thioridazine is an inhibitor of CYP1A2 and CYP3A4.

== History ==
Thioridazine was first synthesized in 1958 by Swiss pharmaceutical company Sandoz. It quickly entered widespread clinical use, as there were few alternatives for treating schizophrenia. In 2005, thioridazine was voluntarily discontinued by its manufacturer, Novartis, worldwide because it caused severe cardiac arrhythmias. However, generics remain on the market in some countries. Generic forms of thioridazine however remain on the market in a few countries, usually with restrictions. For example, in the US it is restricted to patients who have taken at least 2 other antipsychotics that either failed or caused serious side effects.

== Antimicrobial activity ==
Thioridazine is known to kill extensively drug-resistant tuberculosis and to make methicillin-resistant Staphylococcus aureus sensitive to β-lactam antibiotics. A possible mechanism of action for the drug's antibiotic activity is via the inhibition of bacterial secretion pumps. The β-lactam antibiotic resistance is due to the secretion β-lactamase, a protein that destroys antibiotics. If the bacteria cannot secrete the β-lactamase, then the antibiotic will be effective. Phenothiazines more broadly have also been used in combination with other drugs to treat infections caused by pathogenic free living amoeba (PFLA).

== Synthesis ==
Note: Same sidechain used for mesoridazine and sulforidazine.

Thieme Synthesis: Patent: Sidechain: Enantiomers:

The alkylation of 2-Picoline [109-06-8] (1) with formaldehyde gives 2-Pyridineethanol [103-74-2] (2). Forming the quat salt with methyl iodide [74-88-4] leads to 2-(2-hydroxyethyl)-1-methyl-pyridinium iodide [56622-15-2] (3). Catalytic hydrogenation in the presence of hydrochloric acid leads to 2-(2-Chloroethyl)-1-Methylpiperidine [50846-01-0] (4). Alkylation of 2-Methylthiophenothiazine [7643-08-5] (5) in the presence of sodium hydride base completed the synthesis of Thioridazine (6).
