= Embramine =

Chemical compound

Clinical data
- AHFS/Drugs.com: International Drug Names
- ATC code: None

Identifiers
- IUPAC name: 2-[1-(4-Bromophenyl)-1-phenylethoxy]-N,N-dimethylethanamine
- CAS Number: 3565-72-8
- PubChem CID: 19105
- ChemSpider: 18032
- UNII: HH0KD7Z416
- KEGG: D07889
- ChEMBL: ChEMBL2110819
- CompTox Dashboard (EPA): DTXSID60863198

Chemical and physical data
- Formula: C_{18}H_{22}BrNO
- Molar mass: 348.284 g·mol^{−1}
- 3D model (JSmol): Interactive image
- SMILES: CC(C1=CC=CC=C1)(C2=CC=C(C=C2)Br)OCCN(C)C
- InChI: InChI=1S/C18H22BrNO/c1-18(21-14-13-20(2)3,15-7-5-4-6-8-15)16-9-11-17(19)12-10-16/h4-12H,13-14H2,1-3H3; Key:URSRSKSNFPUKGH-UHFFFAOYSA-N

Embramine (trade names Mebryl and Bromadryl) is an antihistamine and anticholinergic.
