= Oxitriptyline =

Chemical compound

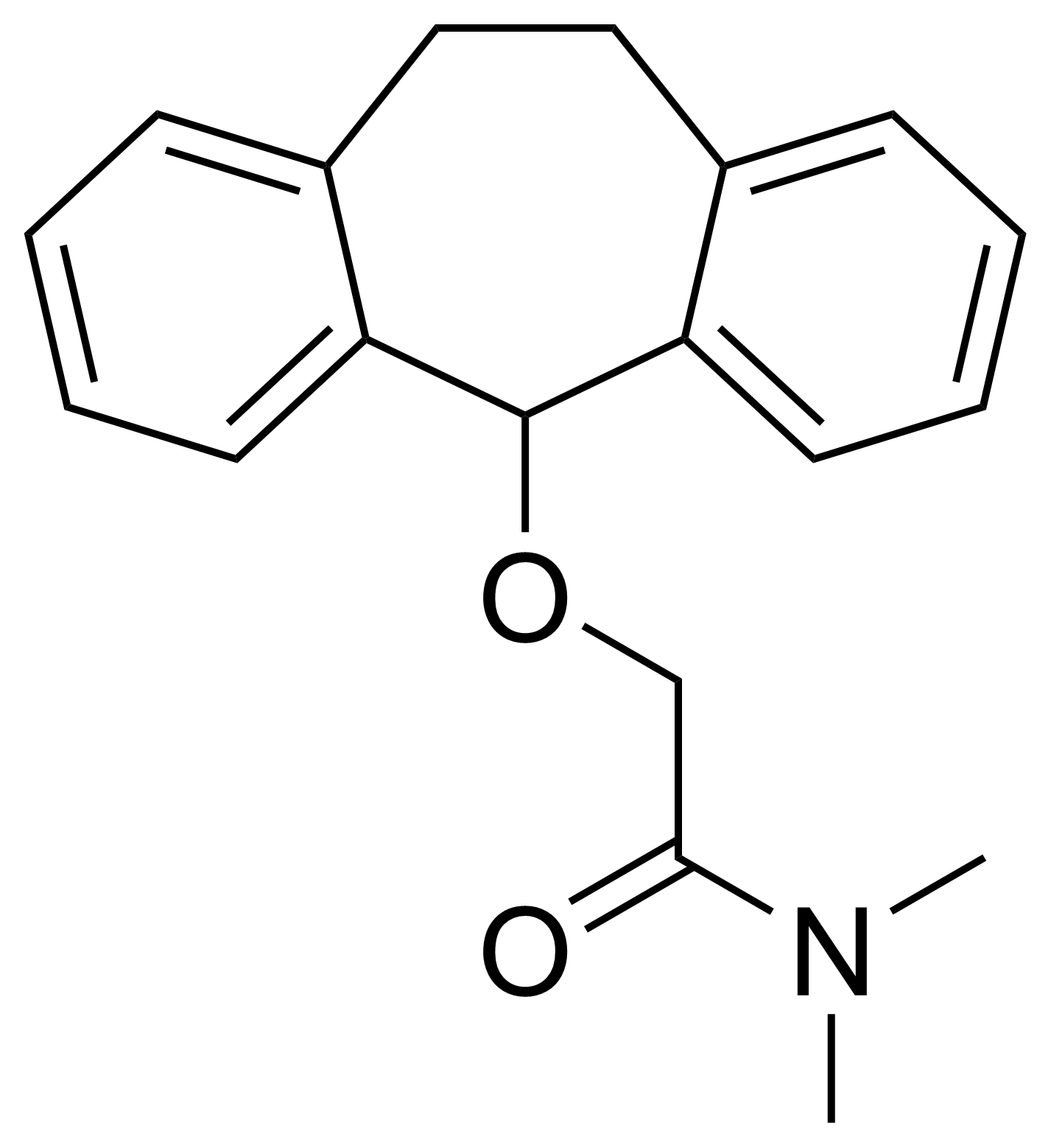

Clinical data
- ATC code: none

Identifiers
- IUPAC name: N,N-dimethyl-2-(2-tricyclo[9.4.0.03,8]pentadeca-1(15),3,5,7,11,13-hexaenyloxy)acetamide
- CAS Number: 29541-85-3
- PubChem CID: 34624
- ChemSpider: 31863
- UNII: 5YGV817KFT
- ChEMBL: ChEMBL2104766
- CompTox Dashboard (EPA): DTXSID60183727

Chemical and physical data
- Formula: C_{19}H_{21}NO_{2}
- Molar mass: 295.382 g·mol^{−1}
- 3D model (JSmol): Interactive image
- SMILES: O=C(N(C)C)COC3c1ccccc1CCc2c3cccc2
- InChI: InChI=1S/C19H21NO2/c1-20(2)18(21)13-22-19-16-9-5-3-7-14(16)11-12-15-8-4-6-10-17(15)19/h3-10,19H,11-13H2,1-2H3; Key:VBEZUCAXMREMFB-UHFFFAOYSA-N

Oxitriptyline (BS-7679) is an anticonvulsant of the tricyclic family which was never marketed.

== See also ==
- Carbamazepine
- Eslicarbazepine
- Oxcarbazepine
- Benzocycloheptenes
