= Citenamide =

Anticonvulsant

Clinical data
- Other names: 5H-Dibenzo[a,d]cycloheptene-5-carboxamide, Cytenamide, AY-15,613.

Identifiers
- IUPAC name: tricyclo[9.4.0.03,8]pentadeca-1(15),3,5,7,9,11,13-heptaene-2-carboxamide
- CAS Number: 10423-37-7
- PubChem CID: 25255
- ChemSpider: 23588
- UNII: 17NZ10DWW0
- KEGG: D03527
- ChEMBL: ChEMBL2104133
- CompTox Dashboard (EPA): DTXSID00146356

Chemical and physical data
- Formula: C_{16}H_{13}NO
- Molar mass: 235.286 g·mol^{−1}
- 3D model (JSmol): Interactive image
- SMILES: C1=CC=C2C(C3=CC=CC=C3C=CC2=C1)C(=O)N
- InChI: InChI=1S/C16H13NO/c17-16(18)15-13-7-3-1-5-11(13)9-10-12-6-2-4-8-14(12)15/h1-10,15H,(H2,17,18); Key:HXQAPLNYYFQSFU-UHFFFAOYSA-N

Citenamide is a tricyclic chemical agent that is very similar in character to and most closely resembles carbamazepine (Tegretol), which a non-addictive anticonvulsant agent used to treat epileptic seizures, schizophrenia, phantom limb pain and alcoholism. Citenamide contains an amide functional group whereas carbamazepine contains a urea. Citenamide is an old drug and there is little pharmacological data surrounding its use in medicine.

== Synthesis ==
Citenamide synthesis

Organometallic formation between 5-chlorodibenzosuberene [18506-04-2] (1) and butyl lithium, is proceeded by a dry ice quench to give the acid, PC12515652 (2). Halogenation with thionyl chloride and Schotten-Baumann reaction with ammonia gives the amide, and hence citenamide (3).
