= 4-Methyldiphenhydramine =

Chemical compound

p-Methyldiphenhydramine
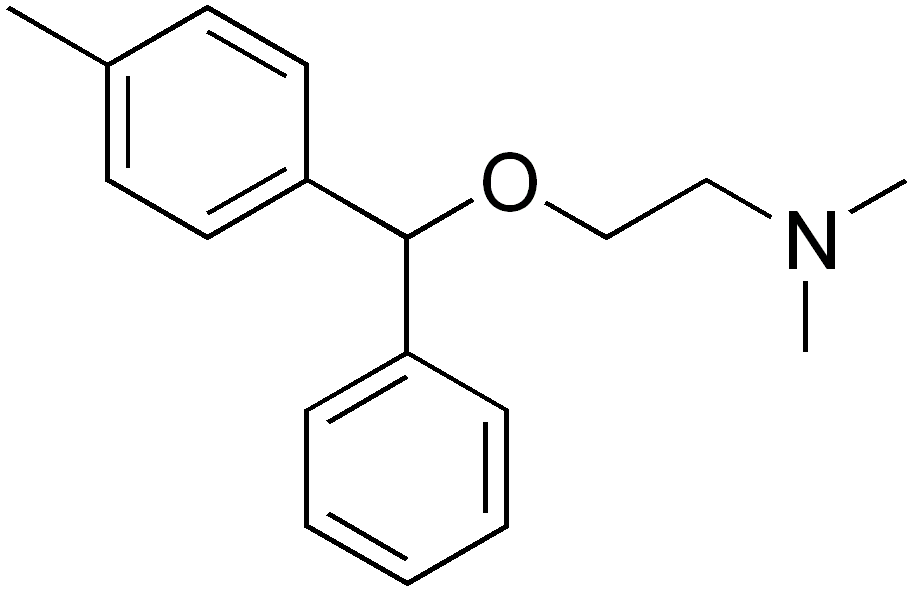

Identifiers
- IUPAC name: N,N-Dimethyl-2-[(4-methylphenyl)(phenyl)methoxy]ethanamine
- CAS Number: 19804-27-4
- PubChem CID: 19935
- ChemSpider: 18776
- UNII: P9633413CU
- CompTox Dashboard (EPA): DTXSID20903322
- ECHA InfoCard: 100.039.375

Chemical and physical data
- Formula: C_{18}H_{23}NO
- Molar mass: 269.388 g·mol^{−1}
- 3D model (JSmol): Interactive image
- SMILES: O(CCN(C)C)C(c1ccccc1)c2ccc(cc2)C
- InChI: InChI=1S/C18H23NO/c1-15-9-11-17(12-10-15)18(20-14-13-19(2)3)16-7-5-4-6-8-16/h4-12,18H,13-14H2,1-3H3; Key:PJUYQWIDNIAHIZ-UHFFFAOYSA-N

4-Methyldiphenhydramine is an antihistamine and anticholinergic.

It is structurally analogous to diphenhydramine.
