= Etifelmine =

Stimulant drug used to treat hypotension

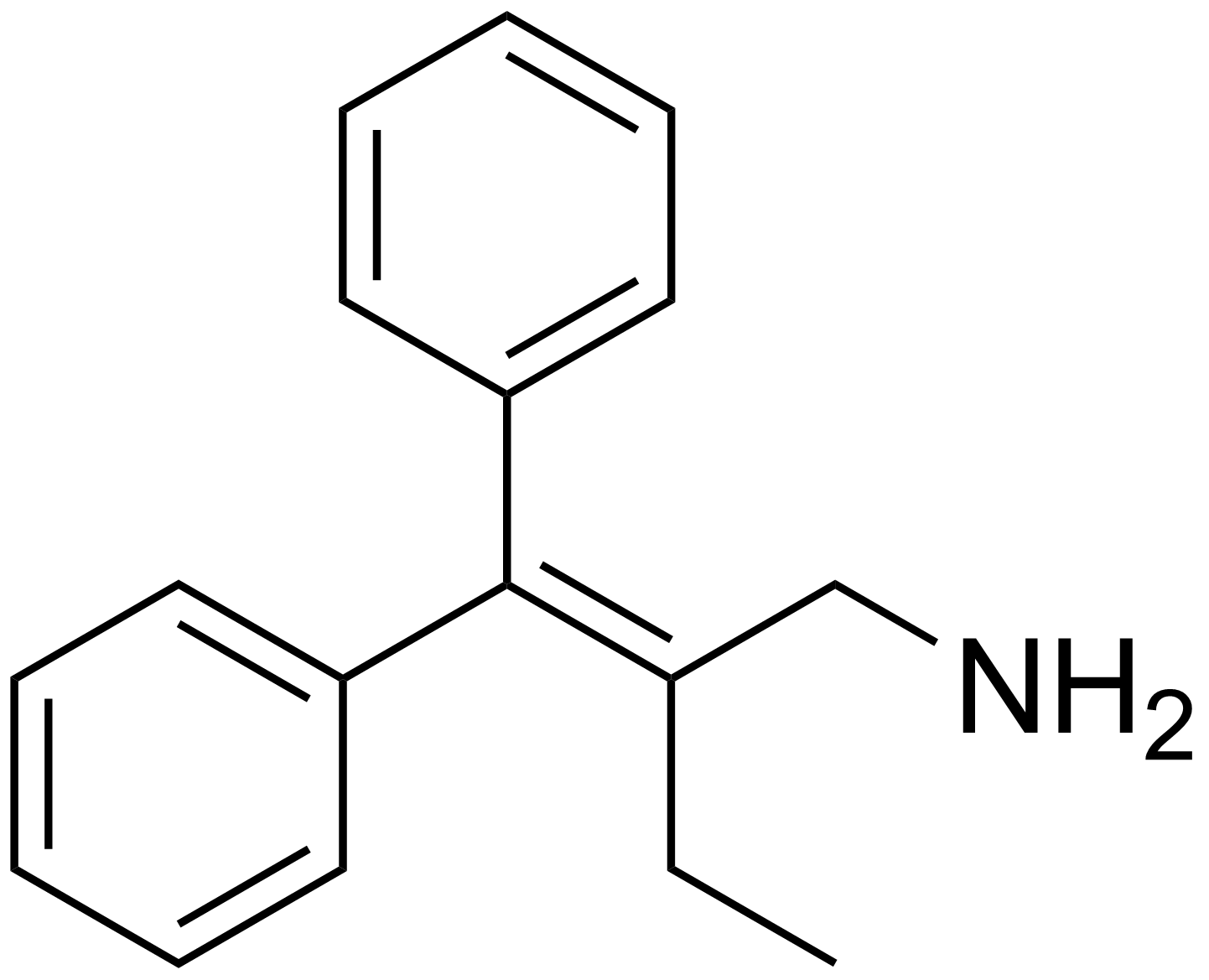

Clinical data
- ATC code: none

Identifiers
- IUPAC name: 2-(Diphenylmethylidene)butan-1-amine
- CAS Number: 341-00-4
- PubChem CID: 68840
- ChemSpider: 62073
- UNII: 1ZFB1FR98E
- ChEMBL: ChEMBL2104621
- CompTox Dashboard (EPA): DTXSID70187690

Chemical and physical data
- Formula: C_{17}H_{19}N
- Molar mass: 237.346 g·mol^{−1}
- 3D model (JSmol): Interactive image
- SMILES: C(=C(/c1ccccc1)c2ccccc2)(\CN)CC
- InChI: InChI=1S/C17H19N/c1-2-14(13-18)17(15-9-5-3-6-10-15)16-11-7-4-8-12-16/h3-12H,2,13,18H2,1H3; Key:WNKCJOWTKXGERE-UHFFFAOYSA-N

Etifelmine (INN; also known as gilutensin) is a stimulant drug. It was used for the treatment of hypotension (low blood pressure).

== Synthesis ==
The base-catalyzed reaction between benzophenone (1) and butyronitrile (2) gives 2-[hydroxy(diphenyl)methyl]butanenitrile (3). Catalytic hydrogenation reduces the nitrile group to a primary amine giving 1,1-diphenyl-2-ethyl-3-aminopropanol (4). The tertiary hydroxyl group is dehydrated by treatment with anhydrous hydrogen chloride gas, completing the synthesis of etifelmine (5).

Synthesis of etifelmine

== See also ==
- 2-MDP
- Pridefine
