= Moxastine =

Chemical compound

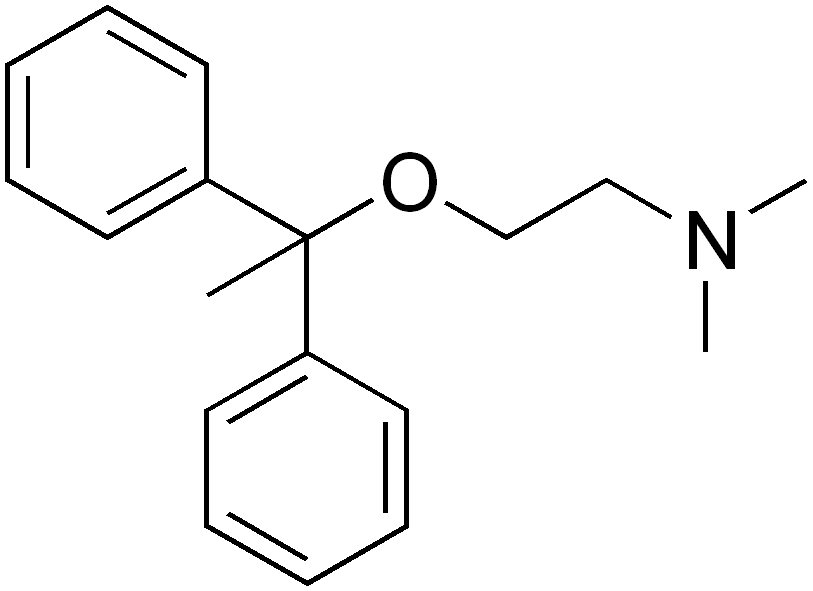

Clinical data
- AHFS/Drugs.com: International Drug Names
- ATC code: none

Identifiers
- IUPAC name: 2-[1,1-di(phenyl)ethoxy]-N,N-dimethylethanamine
- CAS Number: 3572-74-5
- PubChem CID: 19142
- ChemSpider: 18062
- UNII: ZSJ254W6SF
- CompTox Dashboard (EPA): DTXSID60189244
- ECHA InfoCard: 100.020.626

Chemical and physical data
- Formula: C_{18}H_{23}NO
- Molar mass: 269.388 g·mol^{−1}
- 3D model (JSmol): Interactive image
- SMILES: CC(C1=CC=CC=C1)(C2=CC=CC=C2)OCCN(C)C
- InChI: InChI=1S/C18H23NO/c1-18(20-15-14-19(2)3,16-10-6-4-7-11-16)17-12-8-5-9-13-17/h4-13H,14-15H2,1-3H3; Key:BBIMHFSPNXQFAH-UHFFFAOYSA-N

Moxastine (also known as mephenhydramine) is an antihistamine and anticholinergic.

It was developed in Czechoslovakia and sold in hydrochloride form as an antihistamine (Alfadryl).

It is, with 8-chlorotheophylline, a component of cocrystal/salt moxastine teoclate (mephenhydrinate) used as antiemetic (Theadryl; Kinedryl (with caffeine)).

== See also ==
- Diphenhydramine
