= Mariptiline =

Tricyclic antidepressant developed in the 1980s

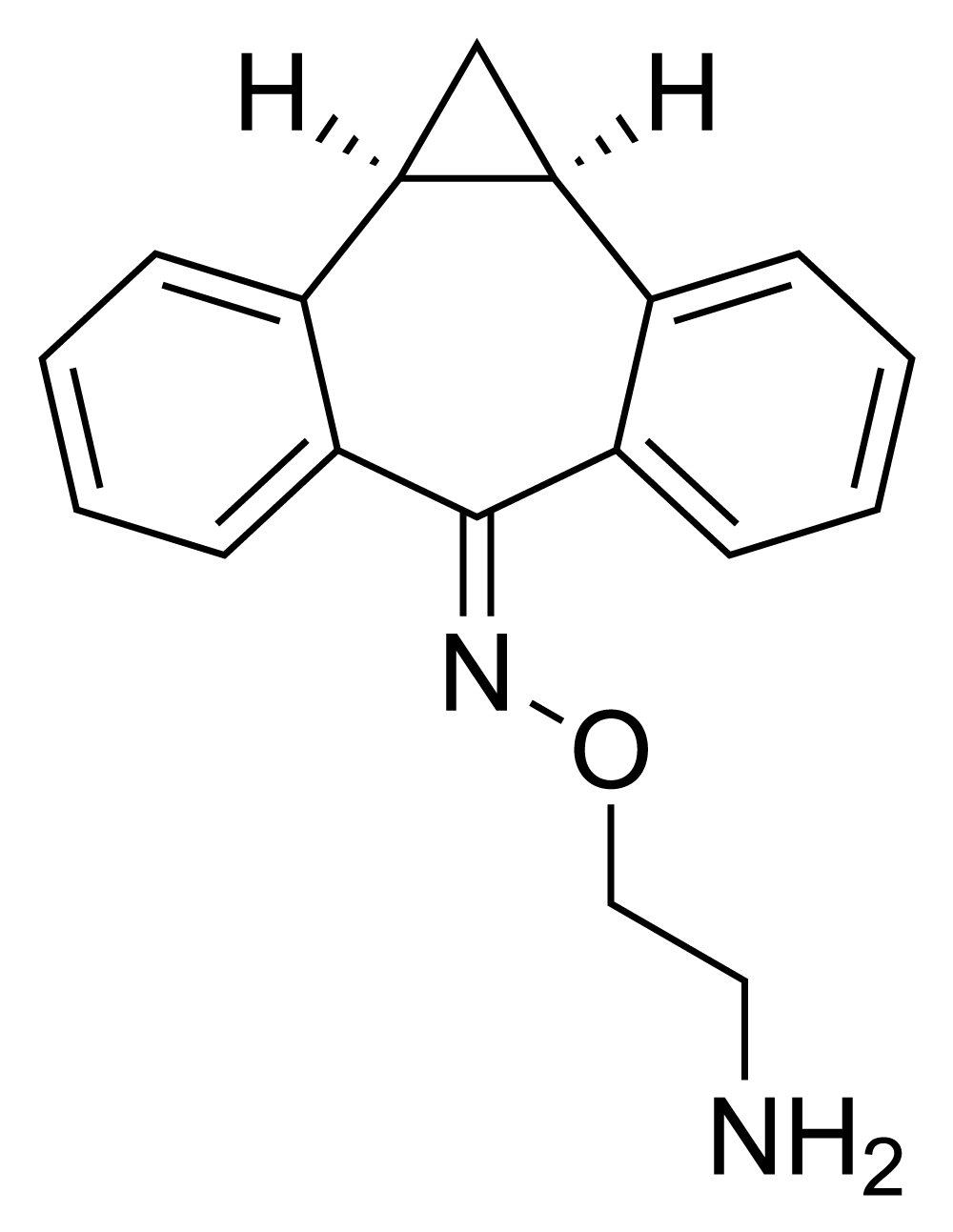

Clinical data
- ATC code: none

Identifiers
- IUPAC name: 1a,10b-dihydrodibenzo[a,e]cyclopropa[c]cyclohepten-6(1H)-one O-(2-aminoethyl)oxime
- CAS Number: 60070-14-6
- PubChem CID: 44203
- ChemSpider: 40222
- UNII: E27T357050
- CompTox Dashboard (EPA): DTXSID20866786

Chemical and physical data
- Formula: C_{18}H_{18}N_{2}O
- Molar mass: 278.355 g·mol^{−1}
- 3D model (JSmol): Interactive image
- SMILES: O(\N=C2/c1c(cccc1)C4CC4c3c2cccc3)CCN

Mariptiline (EN-207) is a tricyclic antidepressant (TCA) which was developed in the early 1980s, but was never marketed.
