= Octriptyline =

Chemical compound

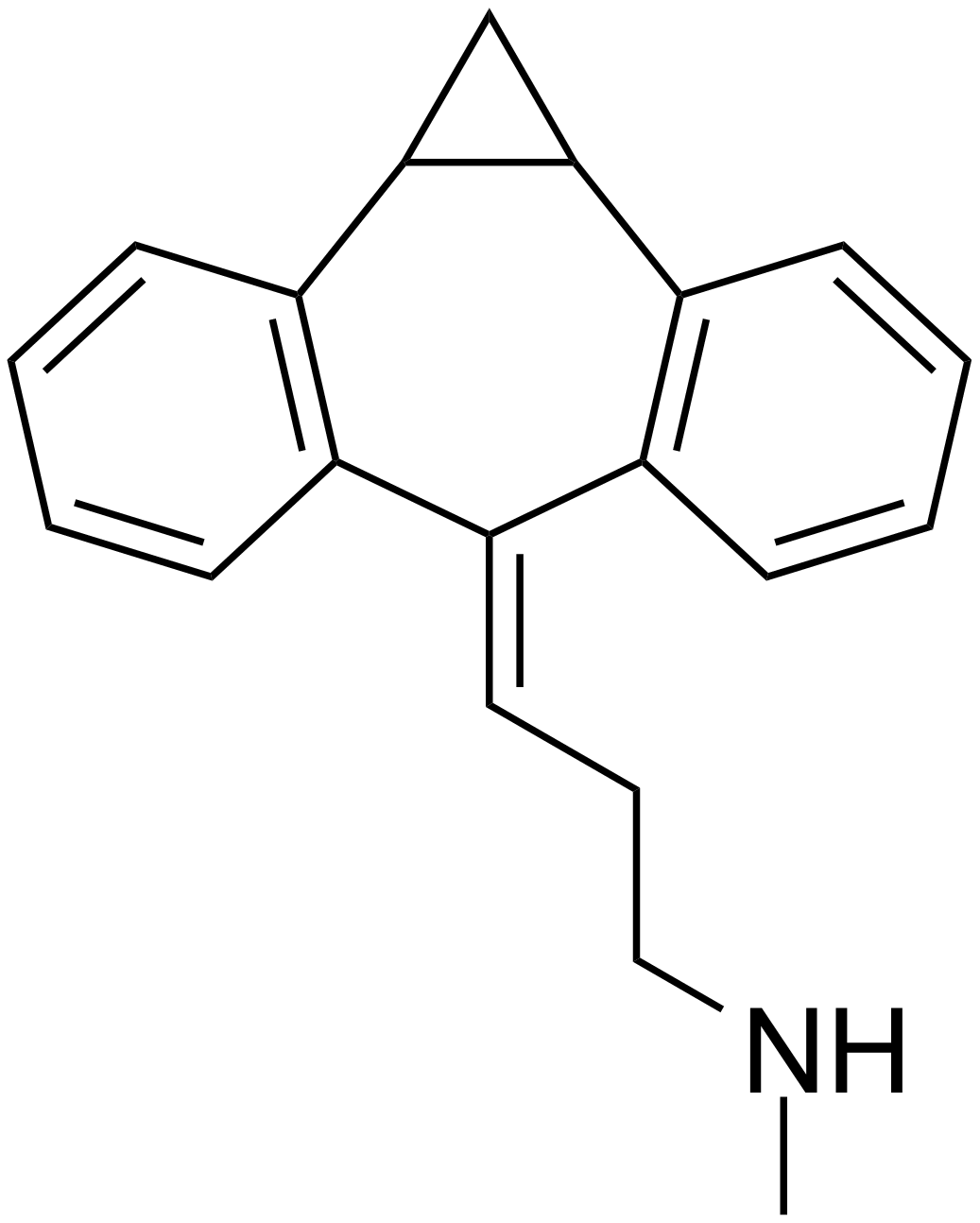

Identifiers
- IUPAC name: N-methyl-3-(11-tetracyclo[10.4.0.02,4.05,10]hexadeca-1(16),5,7,9,12,14-hexaenylidene)propan-1-amine
- CAS Number: 47166-67-6 51481-67-5 (phosphate salt)
- PubChem CID: 40029
- ChemSpider: 36588
- UNII: C3X0UOC25D
- ChEMBL: ChEMBL2110951
- CompTox Dashboard (EPA): DTXSID10963758

Chemical and physical data
- Formula: C_{20}H_{21}N
- Molar mass: 275.395 g·mol^{−1}
- 3D model (JSmol): Interactive image
- SMILES: CNCCC=C1C2=CC=CC=C2C3CC3C4=CC=CC=C41
- InChI: InChI=1S/C20H21N/c1-21-12-6-11-16-14-7-2-4-9-17(14)19-13-20(19)18-10-5-3-8-15(16)18/h2-5,7-11,19-21H,6,12-13H2,1H3; Key:MILRTYCRJIRPKY-UHFFFAOYSA-N

Octriptyline (SC-27,123) is a tricyclic antidepressant (TCA) that was never marketed.

== See also ==
- Benzocycloheptenes
