= Mesoridazine =

Typical antipsychotic medication

Clinical data
- Trade names: Serentil
- AHFS/Drugs.com: Micromedex Detailed Consumer Information
- MedlinePlus: a682306
- Routes of administration: Oral, intravenous
- Drug class: Typical antipsychotic
- ATC code: N05AC03 (WHO)

Legal status
- Legal status: BR: Class C1 (Other controlled substances); In general: ℞ (Prescription only)

Pharmacokinetic data
- Protein binding: 4%
- Metabolism: Hepatic/renal
- Elimination half-life: 24 to 48 hours
- Excretion: Biliary and renal

Identifiers
- IUPAC name: 10-[2-(1-methylpiperidin-2-yl)ethyl]-2-methylsulfinylphenothiazine
- CAS Number: 5588-33-0
- PubChem CID: 4078
- IUPHAR/BPS: 7227
- DrugBank: DB00933
- ChemSpider: 3936
- UNII: 5XE4NWM740
- KEGG: D02671
- ChEBI: CHEBI:6780
- ChEMBL: ChEMBL1088
- CompTox Dashboard (EPA): DTXSID3023265

Chemical and physical data
- Formula: C_{21}H_{26}N_{2}OS_{2}
- Molar mass: 386.57 g·mol^{−1}
- 3D model (JSmol): Interactive image
- Melting point: 130 °C (266 °F)
- Solubility in water: insoluble mg/mL (20 °C)
- SMILES: O=S(c2cc1N(c3c(Sc1cc2)cccc3)CCC4N(C)CCCC4)C
- InChI: InChI=1S/C21H26N2OS2/c1-22-13-6-5-7-16(22)12-14-23-18-8-3-4-9-20(18)25-21-11-10-17(26(2)24)15-19(21)23/h3-4,8-11,15-16H,5-7,12-14H2,1-2H3; Key:SLVMESMUVMCQIY-UHFFFAOYSA-N

Mesoridazine (Serentil) is a phenothiazine class drug that is used in the treatment of schizophrenia. It is one of the active metabolites of thioridazine. The drug's name is derived from the methylsulfoxy and piperidine functional groups in its chemical structure.

It has central antiadrenergic, antidopaminergic, antiserotonergic and weak muscarinic anticholinergic effects.

Serious side effects include akathisia, tardive dyskinesia and the potentially fatal neuroleptic malignant syndrome.

Mesoridazine was withdrawn from the United States market in 2004 due to dangerous side effects, namely irregular heart beat and QT-prolongation of the electrocardiogram.

Mesoridazine is on the FDA's Discontinued Drug Product List.

== Synthesis ==
Thieme Synthesis: Patent:

2-Methylthiophenothiazine [7643-08-5] (1) is treated with acetic anhydride] to give the protected amide, ie 10-acetyl-2-methylthiophenothiazine, CID:69367526. Oxidation of this by means of hydrogen peroxide and removal of the acetyl protecting group with potassium carbonate in methanol solution gives 2-methylsulfonylphenothiazine [23503-68-6] (3). Introduction of the sidechain by alkylation with 2-(2-chlorethyl)-1-methylpiperidine [50846-01-0] (6) in the presence of sodamide, afforded the desired mesoridazine (5).
