= Deptropine =

Chemical compound

Clinical data
- ATC code: R06AX16 (WHO)

Identifiers
- IUPAC name: 3a-[(10,11-dihydro-5H-dibenzo[a,d]cyclohepten-5-yl) oxy]1aH,5aH-tropane
- CAS Number: 604-51-3 2169-75-7
- PubChem CID: 16576
- DrugBank: DB13466
- ChemSpider: 16735768
- UNII: AY31301GKG
- KEGG: D07404
- ChEBI: CHEBI:50189
- ChEMBL: ChEMBL1946186
- CompTox Dashboard (EPA): DTXSID5048556
- ECHA InfoCard: 100.009.154

Chemical and physical data
- Formula: C_{23}H_{27}NO
- Molar mass: 333.475 g·mol^{−1}
- 3D model (JSmol): Interactive image
- SMILES: CN5[C@@H]1CC[C@H]5C[C@H](C1)OC3c4ccccc4CCc2ccccc23
- InChI: InChI=1S/C23H27NO/c1-24-18-12-13-19(24)15-20(14-18)25-23-21-8-4-2-6-16(21)10-11-17-7-3-5-9-22(17)23/h2-9,18-20,23H,10-15H2,1H3/t18-,19+,20+; Key:ZWPODSUQWXAZNC-PMOLBWCYSA-N

Deptropine (Brontina) also known as dibenzheptropine, is an antihistamine with anticholinergic properties acting at the H1 receptor. It is usually marketed as the citrate salt.
