= Metitepine =

Chemical compound

Clinical data
- Other names: Methiothepin; Methiothepine; Ro 8-6837 (maleate); VUFB-6276 (mesylate)

Identifiers
- IUPAC name: 1-methyl-4-(8-methylsulfanyl-5,6-dihydrobenzo[b][1]benzothiepin-6-yl)piperazine
- CAS Number: 20229-30-5 19728-88-2 (maleate)
- PubChem CID: 4106
- IUPHAR/BPS: 89
- ChemSpider: 3963
- UNII: 55D94103HL
- ChEBI: CHEBI:64203
- CompTox Dashboard (EPA): DTXSID2044000
- ECHA InfoCard: 100.261.496

Chemical and physical data
- Formula: C_{20}H_{24}N_{2}S_{2}
- Molar mass: 356.55 g·mol^{−1}
- 3D model (JSmol): Interactive image
- SMILES: CN1CCN(CC1)C2Cc3ccccc3Sc4c2cc(cc4)SC
- InChI: InChI=1S/C20H24N2S2/c1-21-9-11-22(12-10-21)18-13-15-5-3-4-6-19(15)24-20-8-7-16(23-2)14-17(18)20/h3-8,14,18H,9-13H2,1-2H3; Key:RLJFTICUTYVZDG-UHFFFAOYSA-N

Metitepine (INN; developmental code names Ro 8-6837 (maleate), VUFB-6276 (mesylate)), also known as methiothepin, is a drug described as a "psychotropic agent" of the tricyclic or tetracyclic group which was never marketed.

It acts as a non-selective antagonist of serotonin, dopamine, and adrenergic receptors, including of the serotonin 5-HT_{1}, 5-HT_{2}, 5-HT_{5}, 5-HT_{6}, and 5-HT_{7} receptors. The drug has antipsychotic properties.

== Pharmacology ==
=== Pharmacodynamics ===
Metitepine binding profile
Target	Affinity (K_{i}, nM)	Species
5-HT_{1A}	2.2–631	Human
5-HT_{1B}	0.2–40	Human
5-HT_{1D}	5.8–170	Human
5-HT_{1E}	120–209	Human
5-HT_{1F}	646–652	Human
5-HT_{2A}	0.1–3.2	Human
5-HT_{2B}	0.58–2.1	Human
5-HT_{2C}	0.34–4.5	Human
5-HT_{3}	≥3,000	Rat
5-HT_{4}	ND	ND
5-HT_{5A}	1.0–32; 100–126; 29–146	Human; Mouse; Rat
5-HT_{5B}	16; 29–145	Mouse; Rat
5-HT_{6}	0.30–4.1	Human
5-HT_{7}	0.4–4.0	Human
α_{1A}	0.06–7.9	Guinea pig
α_{1B}	0.5	Pig
D_{1}	2.0	Rat
D_{2}	0.40	Rat
Notes: The lower the affinity value, the more avidly the drug binds to the site. Refs:

== Chemistry ==
=== Analogues ===
Metitepine is closely structurally related to certain other tetracyclic compounds including amoxapine, batelapine, clorotepine, clotiapine, clozapine, flumezapine, fluperlapine, loxapine, metiapine, olanzapine, oxyprothepin, perathiepin, perlapine, quetiapine, tampramine, and tenilapine.

=== Synthesis ===
Synthesis:

The reduction of 2-(4-methylsulfanylphenyl)sulfanylbenzoic acid, CID:2733664 (1) gives [2-(4-methylsulfanylphenyl)sulfanylphenyl]methanol, CID:12853582 (2). Halogenating with thionyl chloride gives 1-(chloromethyl)-2-(4-methylsulfanylphenyl)sulfanylbenzene, CID:12853583 (3). FGI with cyanide gives 2-[2-(4-methylsulfanylphenyl)sulfanylphenyl]acetonitrile, CID:12853584 (4). Alkali hydrolysis of the nitrile to 2-[2-(4-methylsulfanylphenyl)sulfanylphenyl]acetic acid, CID:12383832 (5). PPA cyclization to 3-methylsulfanyl-6H-benzo[b][1]benzothiepin-5-one, CID:827052 (6). The reduction with sodium borohydride gives 3-methylsulfanyl-5,6-dihydrobenzo[b][1]benzothiepin-5-ol, CID:13597048 (7). Halogenating with a second round of thionyl chloride gives 5-chloro-3-methylsulfanyl-5,6-dihydrobenzo[b][1]benzothiepine, CID:12404411. Alkylation with 1-methylpiperazine [109-01-3] completed the synthesis of Metitepine (9).
