= C5H5NS =

The molecular formula C_{5}H_{5}NS (molar mass: 111.16 g/mol, exact mass: 111.0143 u) may refer to:

- 2-Mercaptopyridine
- Thiazepines
  - 1,2-Thiazepine
  - 1,3-Thiazepine
  - 1,4-Thiazepine
