= C17H16ClN3O2 =

The molecular formula C_{17}H_{16}ClN_{3}O_{2} (molar mass: 329.781 g/mol) may refer to:

- Carburazepam
- 7-Hydroxyamoxapine
- 8-Hydroxyamoxapine
