= C6H8S =

The molecular formula C_{6}H_{8}S (molar mass: 112.19 g/mol, exact mass: 112.0347 u) may refer to:

- 2,3-Dihydrothiepine
- 2,7-Dihydrothiepine
- 2,5-Dimethylthiophene
