= Dihydrothiepine =

Dihydrothiepine may refer to several isomeric chemical compounds:

- 2,3-Dihydrothiepine
- 2,5-Dihydrothiepine
- 2,7-Dihydrothiepine
- 4,5-Dihydrothiepine
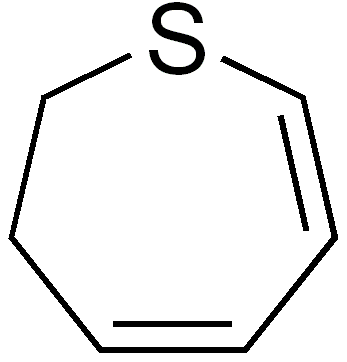
2,3-dihydrothiepine

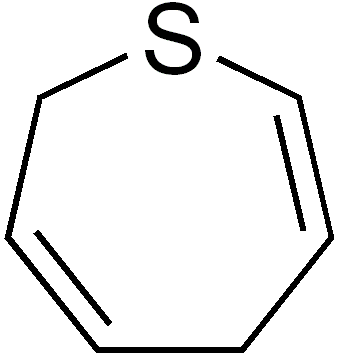
2,5-dihydrothiepine

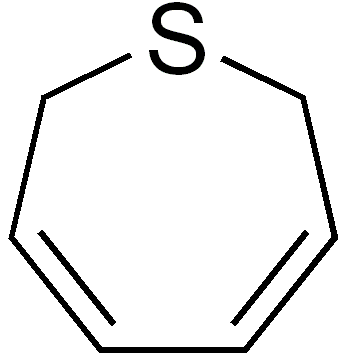
2,7-dihydrothiepine

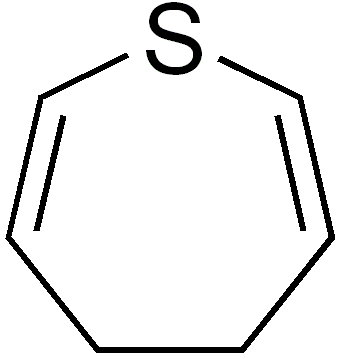
4,5-
