= C17H16ClN3O =

The molecular formula C_{17}H_{16}ClN_{3}O (molar mass: 313.78 g/mol, exact mass: 313.0982 u) may refer to:

- Amoxapine
- YM-976
