= C6H6S =

The molecular formula C_{6}H_{6}S (molar mass: 110.18 g/mol, exact mass: 110.0190 u) may refer to:

- Thiepine, or thiepin
- Thiophenol
