= C19H21N3S =

The molecular formula C_{19}H_{21}N_{3}S (molar mass: 323.46 g/mol, exact mass: 323.1456 u) may refer to:

- Cyamemazine, or cyamepromazine
- Metiapine
