= Dibenzothiazepine =

Class of chemical compounds

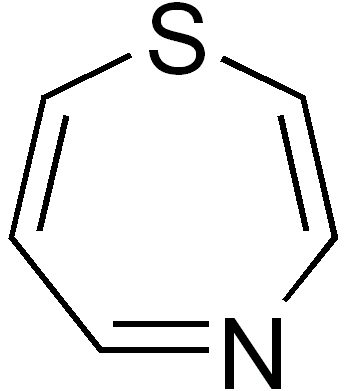
1,4-thiazepine

Quetiapine

Dibenzothiazepines are chemical compounds which are derivatives of thiazepine with two benzene rings.

Examples include quetiapine and metiapine.
