= AH-1058 =

Chemical compound

Legal status
- Legal status: Investigational

Identifiers
- IUPAC name: 1-[(E)-3-(3-Methoxy-2-nitrophenyl)prop-2-enyl]-4-(2-tricyclo[9.4.0.03,8]pentadeca-1(15),3,5,7,9,11,13-heptaenylidene)piperidine
- CAS Number: 300347-11-9 228123-15-7 (HCl)
- PubChem CID: 9804490
- ChemSpider: 7980250
- UNII: 2AH1DI0W9U
- ChEMBL: ChEMBL3638036
- CompTox Dashboard (EPA): DTXSID801112852

Chemical and physical data
- Formula: C_{30}H_{28}N_{2}O_{3}
- Molar mass: 464.565 g·mol^{−1}
- 3D model (JSmol): Interactive image
- SMILES: COC1=CC=CC(=C1[N+](=O)[O-])/C=C/CN2CCC(=C3C4=CC=CC=C4C=CC5=CC=CC=C53)CC2
- InChI: InChI=1S/C30H28N2O3/c1-35-28-14-6-10-25(30(28)32(33)34)11-7-19-31-20-17-24(18-21-31)29-26-12-4-2-8-22(26)15-16-23-9-3-5-13-27(23)29/h2-16H,17-21H2,1H3/b11-7+; Key:HLPYTHVNPSSCNQ-YRNVUSSQSA-N

AH-1058 is a lipophilic antiarrhythmic calcium channel blocker synthesized by the Pharmaceutical Research Laboratories of Ajinomoto Co., Inc in Kawasaki, Japan. It is derived from cyproheptadine, a compound with known antiserotonic, antihistaminic and calcium channel blocking properties. The IUPAC name of AH-1058 is: 4-(5H-dibenzo[a,d]cyclohepten-5-ylidene)-1-[E-3-(3-methoxy-2-nitro) phenyl-2-propenyl]piperidine hydrochloride.

== Medical uses ==
AH-1058 displays characteristics of Class IV antiarrhythmics (L-type calcium channel blockers). Class I antiarrhythmic (sodium channel blocker) characteristics have also been seen, but the effect AH-1058 has on sodium channels is variable and unknown. Some proposed uses for AH-1058 include the treatment of angina pectoris, stenosis of the outflow tract from obstructive hypertrophic cardiomyopathy and ventricular arrhythmias. Treatment of these conditions (long term and short term) is possible due to the cardioselective nature of AH-1058 and the ability of AH-1058 to inhibit calcium channels and thus reduce cardiac contractility and energy consumption.

Studies have compared AH-1058 to widely used and clinically available drugs such as verapamil (a Class IV antiarrhythmic drug) and atenolol (a beta blocker) to assess the efficacy of AH-1058. The effects of AH-1058 are slower to onset but longer-lasting than those of verapamil and atenolol. In addition, the minimal effects AH-1058 has on total peripheral vascular resistance is an important advantage over atenolol and verapamil, as these drugs can be taken long term for disease management. Lastly AH-1058 displays a greater selectivity for cardiac tissue over verapamil and atenolol with the same level of potency as verapamil in vitro. AH-1058 studies have been limited to in vitro and in vivo canine and guinea-pig models, with a greater potency displayed in vitro than in vivo. Along with decreased potency in vivo, blood levels do not correlate with AH-1058 activity.

== Pharmacology ==
=== Mechanism of action ===
AH-1058 is a cardioselective L-type calcium channel blocker. AH-1058 binds to the same sites on the alpha-1 subunit of L-type calcium channels as phenylalkylamines (ex. verapamil) and benzothiazepines; both of which are well known calcium channel blockers. These sites on the alpha-1 subunit differ from the active site of the calcium channel, meaning AH-1058 binds L-type calcium channels allosterically to alter activity. In addition AH-1058 appears to interact with multiple states of L-type calcium channels (i.e. resting and inactive) to suppress calcium currents. A minor effect on sodium channels at higher concentrations has also been seen, but these effects appear to vary between species.

=== Mode of action ===
The calcium blocking activity of AH-1058 can decrease ventricular contractility, heart rate, and conductance through the atrioventricular node. In addition AH-1058 has been shown to decrease systolic blood pressure while minimally affecting total peripheral vascular resistance and leaving diastolic blood pressure unaffected. The order of the potency of the effects AH-1058 has on the cardiovascular system is: ventricular contraction > coronary blood flow >> atrioventricular conduction > sinoatrial automaticity (level of sinoatrial self-activation).
