= Perlapine =

Sedative and hypnotic medication

Clinical data
- Trade names: Hypnodine, Pipnodine
- Other names: AW-14233; HF-2333; MP-11; PLP 100-127; 6-(4-Methyl-1-piperazinyl)morphanthridine

Identifiers
- IUPAC name: 6-(4-Methylpiperazin-1-yl)-11H-benzo[c][1]benzazepine
- CAS Number: 1977-11-3
- PubChem CID: 16106
- ChemSpider: 15291
- UNII: 4N8UJJ27IM
- KEGG: D01438
- ChEBI: CHEBI:31983
- ChEMBL: ChEMBL340801
- CompTox Dashboard (EPA): DTXSID1048758
- ECHA InfoCard: 100.241.831

Chemical and physical data
- Formula: C_{19}H_{21}N_{3}
- Molar mass: 291.398 g·mol^{−1}
- 3D model (JSmol): Interactive image
- SMILES: CN1CCN(CC1)C2=NC3=CC=CC=C3CC4=CC=CC=C42
- InChI: InChI=1S/C19H21N3/c1-21-10-12-22(13-11-21)19-17-8-4-2-6-15(17)14-16-7-3-5-9-18(16)20-19/h2-9H,10-14H2,1H3; Key:PWRPUAKXMQAFCJ-UHFFFAOYSA-N

Perlapine, sold under the brand names Hypnodine and Pipnodine, is a hypnotic and sedative of the tricyclic group which is marketed in Japan. It acts primarily as a potent antihistamine, and also has anticholinergic, antiserotonergic, antiadrenergic, and some antidopaminergic activity. The drug has relatively weak affinity for the dopamine D_{2} receptor (IC_{50} = 1,803 nM) and, in accordance, is said to be ineffective as an antipsychotic. However, it retains higher affinity for the dopamine D_{1} receptor (IC_{50} = 198 nM). Its IC_{50} values are 19 nM for the α_{1}-adrenergic receptor, 4,945 nM for the α_{2}-adrenergic receptor, and 70 nM for the serotonin 5-HT_{2A} receptor. Perlapine is closely related to clotiapine, clozapine, fluperlapine, loxapine, and tilozepine.

Perlapine has been suggested as a potential ligand for certain DREADDs.
