= Dilacor =

Dilacor is a trade name for several drugs. This homonymy has resulted in at least one hospitalization due to a patient receiving the wrong medication for their medical prescription.

- Dilacor, a brand of diltiazem in the United States
- Dilacor, a brand of digoxin in Serbia
- Dilacor, a brand of barnidipine in Argentina
- Dilacor, a brand of verapamil in Brazil
