= K201 =

K201 or K-201 may refer to:

- K-201 (Kansas highway), a former state highway in Kansas
- JTV-519, a 1,4-benzothiazepine derivative known as K201
- K201, a South Korean grenade launcher, clone of the American M203 grenade launcher
