= 2-Hexanone =

Chemical compound (C6H12O)

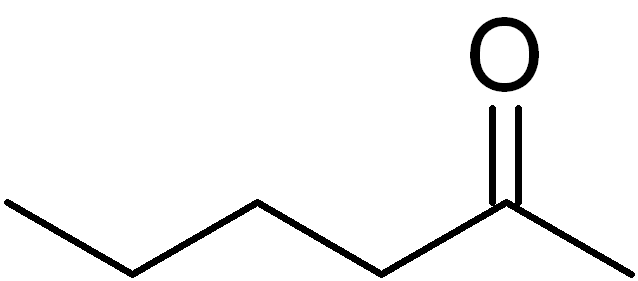
- Skeletal formula of hexan-2-one

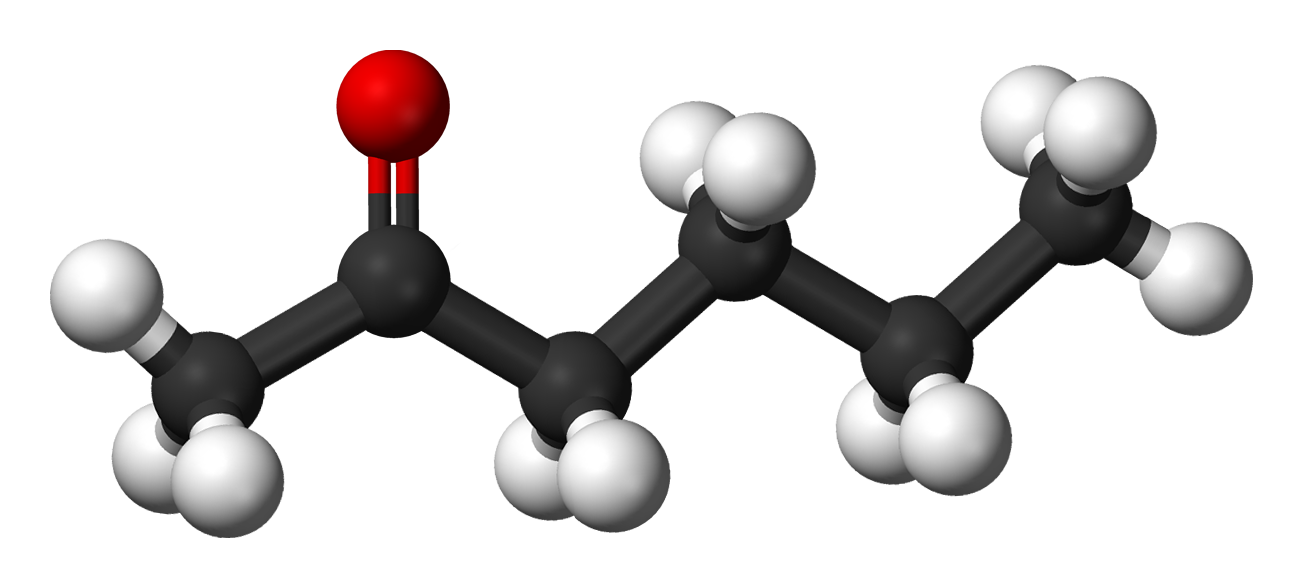
- Ball-and-stick model of hexan-2-one

Names
- Preferred IUPAC name Hexan-2-one
- Other names Methyl butyl ketone; Methyl n-butyl ketone; MNBK; Butyl methyl ketone; MBK; n-Butyl methyl ketone; Propylacetone

Identifiers
CAS Number	591-78-6
3D model (JSmol)	Interactive image
ChEMBL	ChEMBL195861
ChemSpider	11095
ECHA InfoCard	100.008.848
EC Number	209-731-1
PubChem CID	11583
RTECS number	MP1400000
UNII	6QDY60NH6N
CompTox Dashboard (EPA)	DTXSID0022068
- InChI: InChI=1S/C6H12O/c1-3-4-5-6(2)7/h3-5H2,1-2H3 Key: QQZOPKMRPOGIEB-UHFFFAOYSA-N; InChI=1/C6H12O/c1-3-4-5-6(2)7/h3-5H2,1-2H3 Key: QQZOPKMRPOGIEB-UHFFFAOYAQ
- SMILES: O=C(C)CCCC

Properties
Chemical formula	C_{6}H_{12}O
Molar mass	100.161 g·mol^{−1}
Appearance	Colorless to light yellow liquid
Odor	sharp, acetone-like
Density	0.8113 g/cm^{3}
Melting point	−55.5 °C (−67.9 °F; 217.7 K)
Boiling point	127.6 °C (261.7 °F; 400.8 K)
Solubility in water	1.4% (14 g/L)
Vapor pressure	1.3 kPa (20 °C)
Magnetic susceptibility (χ)	−69.1·10^{−6} cm^{3}/mol
Refractive index (n_{D})	1.403 (20 °C)
Viscosity	0.63 mPa·s (20 °C)

Hazards
- GHS labelling
Pictograms	(GHS02: Flammable) (GHS07: Exclamation mark) (GHS08: Health hazard)
Signal word	Danger
Hazard statements	H226, H336, H361f, H372
Precautionary statements	P201, P202, P210, P233, P240, P241, P242, P243, P260, P264, P270, P271, P280, P281, P303+P361+P353, P304+P340, P308+P313, P312, P314, P370+P378, P403+P233, P403+P235, P405, P501
NFPA 704 (fire diamond)	2 3 0
Flash point	25 °C (77 °F; 298 K)
Autoignition temperature	423 °C (793 °F; 696 K)
Explosive limits	?-8%
- Lethal dose or concentration (LD, LC)
LD_{50} (median dose)	2590 mg/kg (oral, rat); 2430 mg/kg (oral, mouse); 4860 mg/kg (dermal, rabbit); 2590 mg/kg (oral, guinea pig)
LD_{Lo} (lowest published)	914 mg/kg (rat, oral)
LC_{50} (median concentration)	8000 ppm (rat, 4 hr)
LC_{Lo} (lowest published)	20,000 ppm (guinea pig, 70 min)
- NIOSH (US health exposure limits)
PEL (Permissible)	TWA 100 ppm (410 mg/m^{3})
REL (Recommended)	TWA 1 ppm (4 mg/m^{3})
IDLH (Immediate danger)	1600 ppm
- Except where otherwise noted, data are given for materials in their standard state (at 25 °C [77 °F], 100 kPa). verify (what is ?) Infobox references

2-Hexanone, also known as methyl butyl ketone, MBK, is an organic compound with the molecular formula CH_{3}C(O)(CH_{2})_{3}CH_{3}. It is classified as a ketone. The compound is a colorless, water-like liquid that is used as a general solvent and in paints. It dissolves cellulose nitrate, vinyl polymers and copolymers, and natural and synthetic resins. It is recommended as a solvent because it is photochemically inactive; however it has a very low safe threshold limit value.

== Safety ==
2-Hexanone is absorbed through the lungs, orally and dermally and its metabolite, 2,5-hexanedione, is neurotoxic. Animal tests have shown that the neurotoxic effect of 2-hexanone may be potentiated by simultaneous administration of 2-butanone (methyl ethyl ketone, MEK).

== Related compounds ==
- 5-Methyl-2-hexanone
