= CR gas =

Incapacitating gas used in riot control

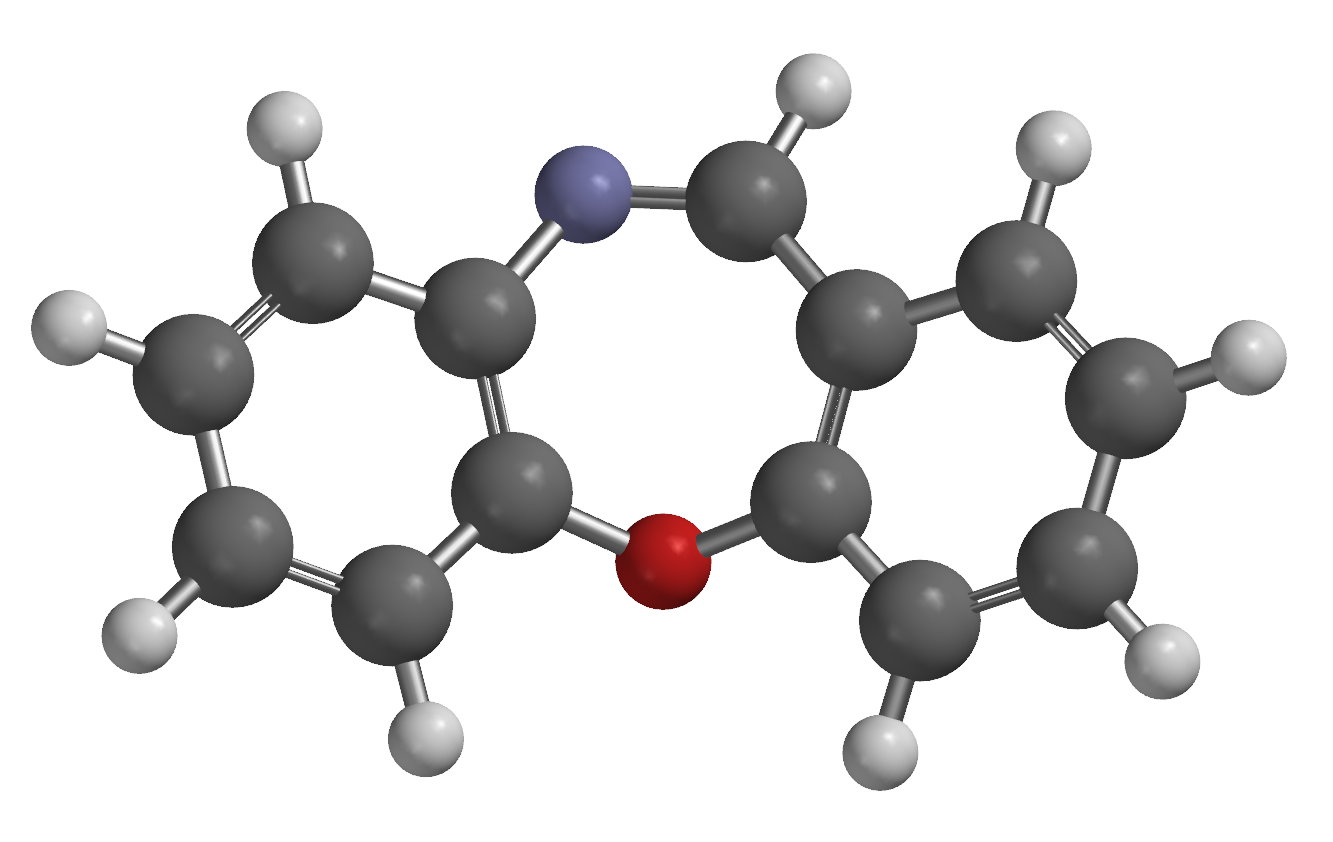

Names
- Preferred IUPAC name Dibenzo[b,f][1,4]oxazepine

Identifiers
CAS Number	257-07-8
3D model (JSmol)	Interactive image
ChEMBL	ChEMBL1085100
ChemSpider	8858
ECHA InfoCard	100.114.990
IUPHAR/BPS	6472
PubChem CID	9213
UNII	C1Q77A87V1
CompTox Dashboard (EPA)	DTXSID8059764
- InChI: InChI=1S/C13H9NO/c1-3-7-12-10(5-1)9-14-11-6-2-4-8-13(11)15-12/h1-9H Key: NPUACKRELIJTFM-UHFFFAOYSA-N; InChI=1/C13H9NO/c1-3-7-12-10(5-1)9-14-11-6-2-4-8-13(11)15-12/h1-9H Key: NPUACKRELIJTFM-UHFFFAOYAI
- SMILES: N\1=C\c3c(Oc2c/1cccc2)cccc3

Properties
Chemical formula	C_{13}H_{9}NO
Molar mass	195.221 g·mol^{−1}
Density	1.160±0.10 g/cm^{3}
Melting point	73 °C (163 °F; 346 K)
- Except where otherwise noted, data are given for materials in their standard state (at 25 °C [77 °F], 100 kPa). verify (what is ?) Infobox references

CR gas or dibenzoxazepine (chemical name dibenz[b,f][1,4]oxazepine, is an incapacitating agent and a lachrymatory agent. CR was developed by the British Ministry of Defence as a riot control agent in the late 1950s and early 1960s. A report from the Porton Down laboratories described exposure as "like being thrown blindfolded into a bed of stinging nettles", and it earned the nickname "firegas".

In its effects, CR gas is very similar to CS gas (o-chlorobenzylidene malononitrile), but twice as potent, even though there is little structural resemblance between the two. For example, 2 mg of dry CR causes skin redness in 10 min, 5 mg causes burning and erythremia, and 20 mg—strong pain. Water usually amplifies the pain effect of CR on skin. CR aerosols cause irritation at concentrations of 0.2 mcg/L, becoming intolerable at 3 mcg/L. The LD_{50} of CR through air inhalation 350 mg·min/L.

== Physical properties and deployment ==
CR is a pale yellow crystalline solid with a spicy odor. It is slightly soluble in water and does not degrade in it. CR is usually presented as a microparticulate solid, in the form of suspension in a propylene glycol-based liquid. Contrary to its common name, it is not a gas but a solid at room temperature.

The dibenz[b,f][1,4]oxazepine moiety is present in the typical antipsychotic drug loxapine, but, unlike CR, loxapine is not reactive and is not an irritant. CR was first synthesised in 1962.

CR can be delivered either as an aerosol or a solution in water, making it able to be used in water cannons, smoke grenades, or handheld spray cans. For smoke it is usually fired in canisters (LACR) that heat up, producing an aerosol cloud at a steady rate.

== Effects ==
CR gas is a lachrymatory agent (LA), exerting its effects through activation of the TRPA1 channel. Its effects are approximately 6 to 10 times more powerful than those of CS gas. CR causes intense skin irritation, in particular around moist areas; blepharospasm, causing temporary blindness; and coughing, gasping for breath, and panic. It is capable of causing immediate incapacitation. It is a suspected carcinogen. It is toxic, but less so than CS gas, by ingestion and exposure. However, it can be lethal in large quantities. In a poorly ventilated space, an individual may inhale a lethal dose within minutes. Death is caused by asphyxiation and pulmonary edema.

The effect of CR is long-term and persistent. CR can persist on surfaces, especially porous ones, for up to 60 days.

== Treatment ==
While CS can be decontaminated with a large amount of water, use of water may exacerbate the effects of CR. Skin contaminated with CR gas may become extremely painful in contact with water for up to 48 hours after contamination.

Medical treatment is mostly palliative. The contaminated clothing has to be removed. The eyes and skin can be washed, the eye pain can be alleviated with medications.

== Use ==
=== Egypt ===
During the 2011 protests against the military government in Egypt, Egyptian security forces allegedly used CR gas in addition to the more commonly used, less debilitating CS gas. One protester described the gas as making him feel "as if your eyes are about to fall out; then you have trouble breathing, and you lose your sight". Egyptians used yeast as a treatment for CR side effects on skin. Mohammed ElBaradei also confirmed via Twitter that "tear gas with [a] nerve agent" is being used in Tahrir Square.

The only gas that has been identified by human rights organizations in protests "is CS tear gas, typically used by police forces to disperse crowds," stated Egyptian journalist Farida Helmy. Egyptian use of CR gas has not been corroborated according to Human Rights Watch.

=== France ===
People occupying an area in Notre-Dame-des-Landes against an airport project reported the use of CR gas by French police and army, during the eviction operation of April 2018.

=== Northern Ireland ===
It started being available in police and army supplies, as a water cannon additive and as spray cans, in 1973 and was at least still so in 1981.

Republican groups in Northern Ireland have alleged that British Army and Royal Ulster Constabulary units used CR gas against Republican prisoners in the 1970s. Additionally, there are British military documents now declassified and in the public domain held in the records of the UK Ministry of Defence at the National Archives, London, that suggest that the British Army did deploy and use CR gas in Northern Ireland.

=== Philippines ===
CR tear gas was used in suppression of the mutiny in Makati that was led by Sen. Antonio Trillanes. The tear gas was fired in the building and all the people in the building including reporters were affected.

=== South Africa ===
In the late 1980s, CR was used in the townships in South Africa. It caused some fatalities, in particular among children.

=== Sri Lanka ===
The Tamil Tigers of Sri Lanka, an insurgent group in Sri Lanka used CR gas against government forces that were on an offensive to flush and defeat these insurgents during September 2008. Its use hindered the army's progress but ultimately proved ineffective in preventing the army from overrunning their positions. This is one of the first few cases of insurgents using CR gas as an insurgent weapon.

=== Turkey ===
In the June 2013 protest against the Turkish government, Turkish police allegedly used CR gas on protesters in Istanbul. Doctors in a makeshift first aid post in a Mosque judged it as such.

=== Ukraine ===
In Ukraine, CR gas was commonly used by special forces against demonstrators. Gas is packed in a form of spray cans "Cobra 1". For example, gas had been used on a demonstration dedicated to the Ukraine Independence Day (24 August 2011). Also gas usage has been documented during demonstrations against Language Law Draft in Kyiv on 3 and 4 July 2012.

== See also ==
- CS gas
- Loxapine
- Pepper spray and Tear gas
- Resiniferatoxin
