= 2-Mercaptopyridine =

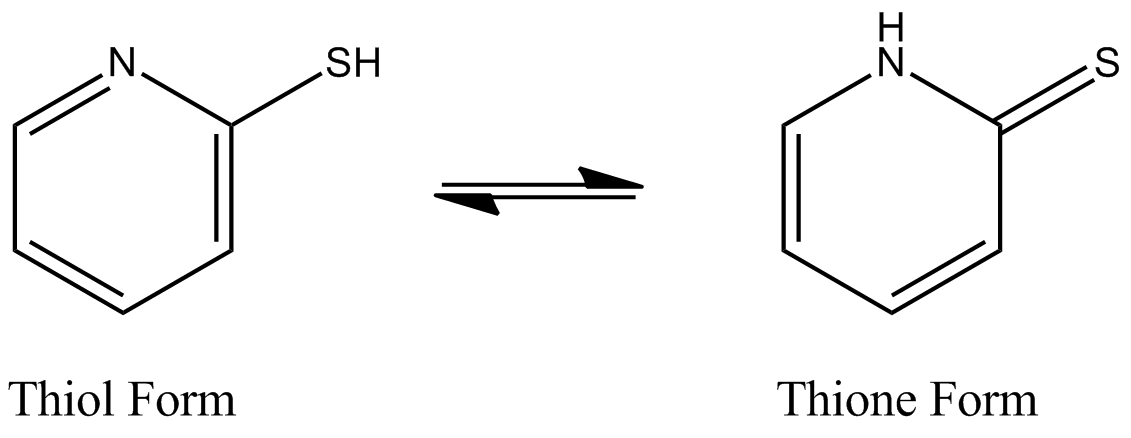

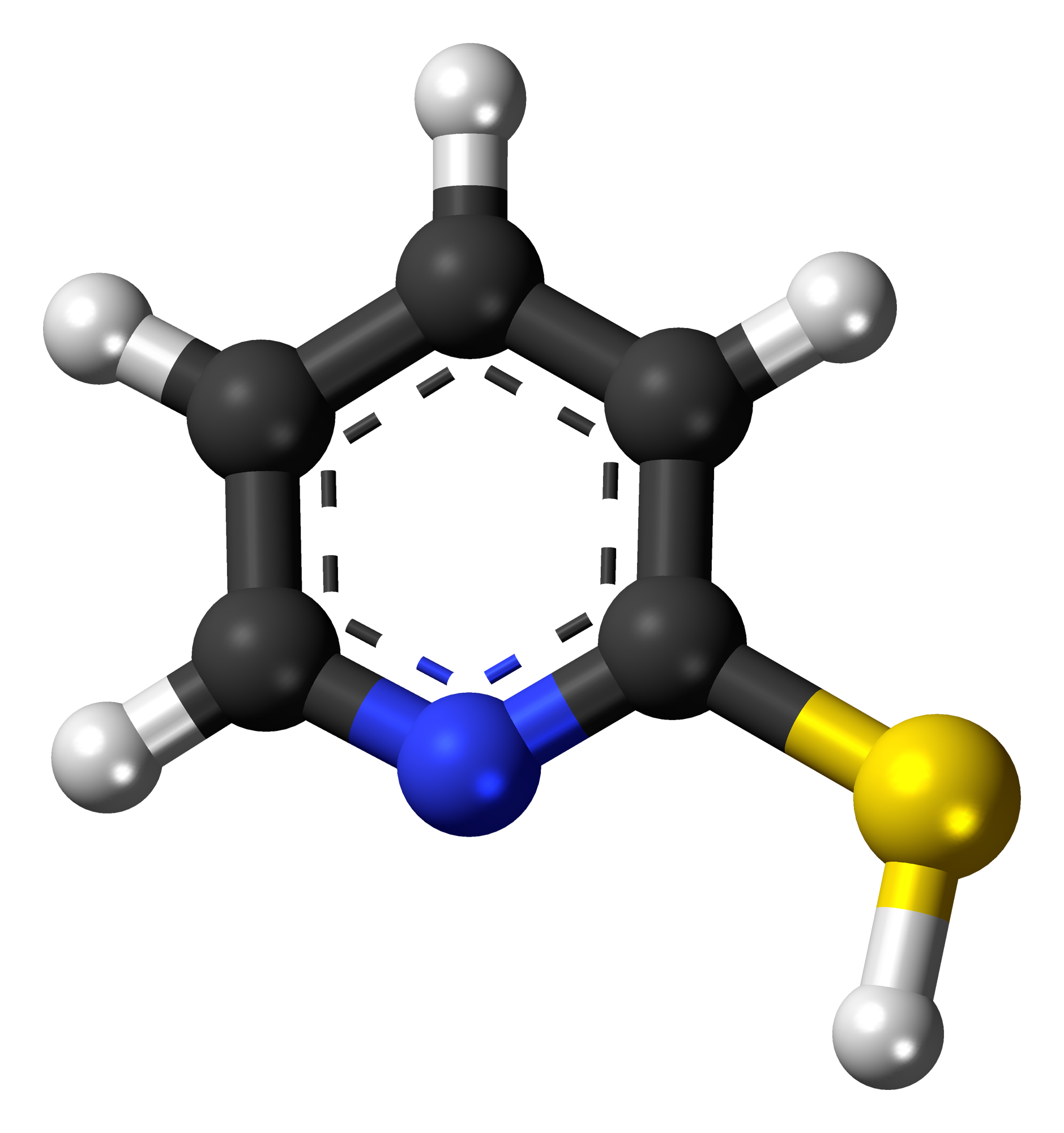

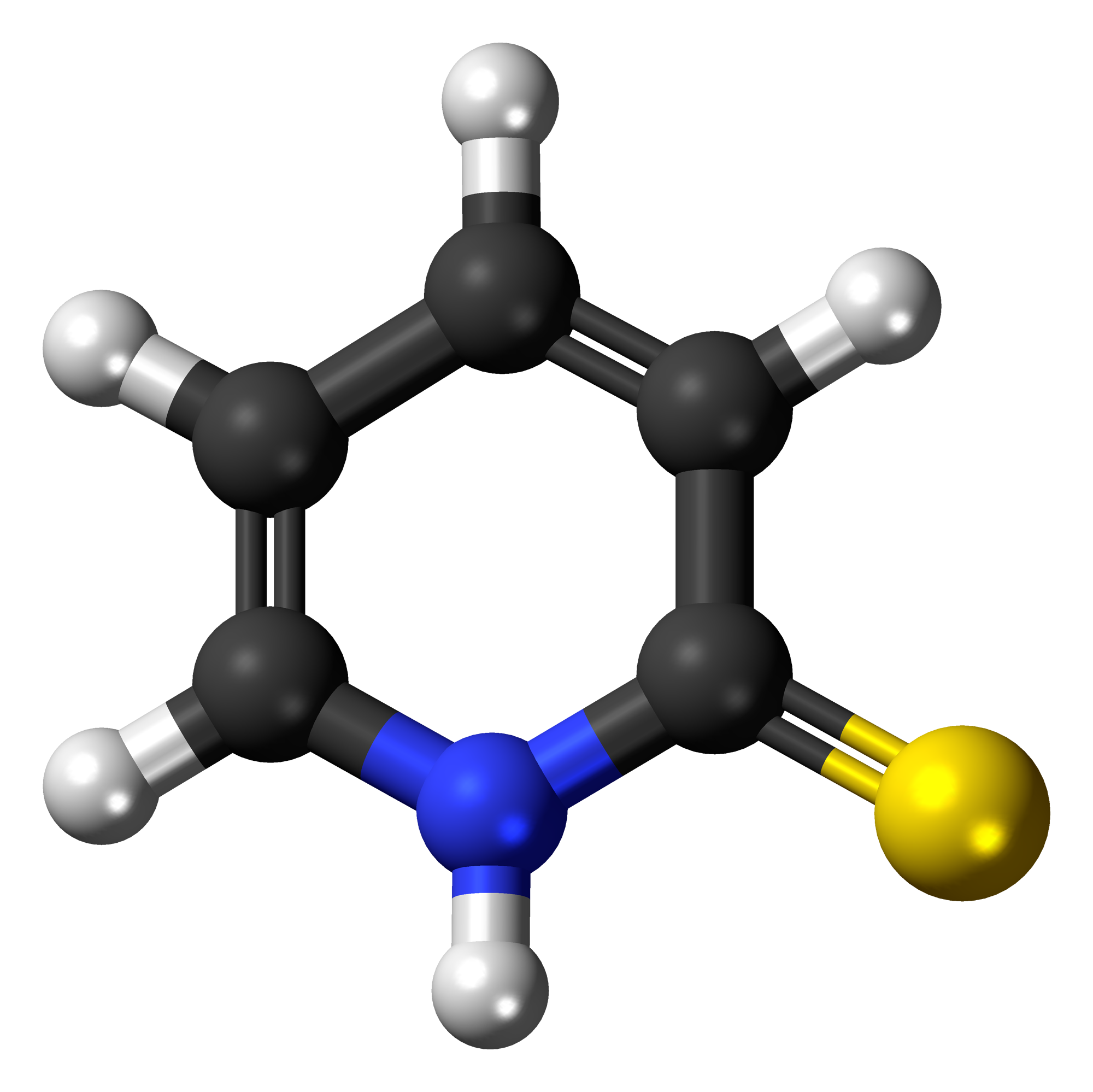

Names
- Preferred IUPAC name Pyridine-2-thiol
- Other names 2-Thiopyridine; 2-Thiopyridone; Pyrid-2-thione; 2-Pyridyl mercaptan 2-Pyridinethiol; 2-Pyridinethione

Identifiers
CAS Number	73018-10-7
3D model (JSmol)	Interactive image
Beilstein Reference	105787
ChEBI	CHEBI:45223
ChEMBL	ChEMBL1235541
ChemSpider	2005897
DrugBank	DB03329
EC Number	220-131-9
PubChem CID	2723698
UNII	EE982KT952
CompTox Dashboard (EPA)	DTXSID9062568
- InChI: InChI=1S/C5H5NS/c7-5-3-1-2-4-6-5/h1-4H,(H,6,7) Key: WHMDPDGBKYUEMW-UHFFFAOYSA-N; InChI=1/C5H5NS/c7-5-3-1-2-4-6-5/h1-4H,(H,6,7) Key: WHMDPDGBKYUEMW-UHFFFAOYAE
- SMILES: S=C1/C=C\C=C/N1

Properties
Chemical formula	C_{5}H_{5}NS
Molar mass	111.16 g·mol^{−1}
Appearance	yellow crystalline powder
Melting point	128 to 130 °C (262 to 266 °F; 401 to 403 K)
Solubility in water	50 g/L

Hazards
- GHS labelling
Pictograms	(GHS07: Exclamation mark)
Signal word	Warning
Hazard statements	H315, H319, H335
Precautionary statements	P261, P264, P271, P280, P302+P352, P304+P340, P305+P351+P338, P312, P321, P332+P313, P337+P313, P362, P403+P233, P405, P501
Safety data sheet (SDS)	MSDS
- Except where otherwise noted, data are given for materials in their standard state (at 25 °C [77 °F], 100 kPa). verify (what is ?) Infobox references

2-Mercaptopyridine is an organosulfur compound with the formula HSC_{5}H_{4}N. This yellow crystalline solid is a derivative of pyridine. The compound and its derivatives serve primarily as acylating agents. A few of 2-mercaptopyridine's other uses include serving as a protecting group for amines and imides as well as forming a selective reducing agent. 2-Mercaptopyridine oxidizes to [[2,2′-dipyridyl disulfide]].

== Preparation ==
2-Mercaptopyridine was originally synthesized in 1931 by heating 2-chloropyridine with calcium hydrogen sulfide.

ClC_{5}H_{4}N + Ca(SH)_{2} → HSC_{5}H_{4}N + Ca(SH)Cl

A more convenient route to 2-mercaptopyridine is the reaction of 2-chloropyridine and thiourea in ethanol and aqueous ammonia.

2-Mercaptopyridine derivatives can also be generated from precursors lacking preformed pyridine rings. It arises for example in the condensation of α,β-unsaturated ketones, malononitrile, and 4-methylbenzenethiol under microwave irradiation. The reaction is conducted with a base catalyst.

== Structure and properties ==
Similar in nature to 2-hydroxypyridine, 2-mercaptopyridine converts to the thione (or more accurately thioamide) tautomer. The preferred form is dependent on temperature, concentration, and solvent. The thiol is favored at lower temperatures, lower concentrations, and in less polar solvents. 2-Mercaptopyridine is favored in dilute solutions and in solvents capable of hydrogen bonding. These solvents will compete with other 2-mercaptopyridines to prevent self association. Thioamide-thiol tautomerism has also been demonstrated for 4-mercaptopyridine and 2-mercaptoquinoline.

The association constant for this reaction between mutual 2-mercaptopyridines is described below. The ratio is of monosulfide to disulfide in chloroform.

K_{association} = (2.7±0.5)×10^{3}

== Reactions ==
2-Mercaptopyridine oxidizes to 2,2'-dipyridyl disulfide. As amines are good catalysts for the oxidation of thiols to disulfides, this process is autocatalytic.

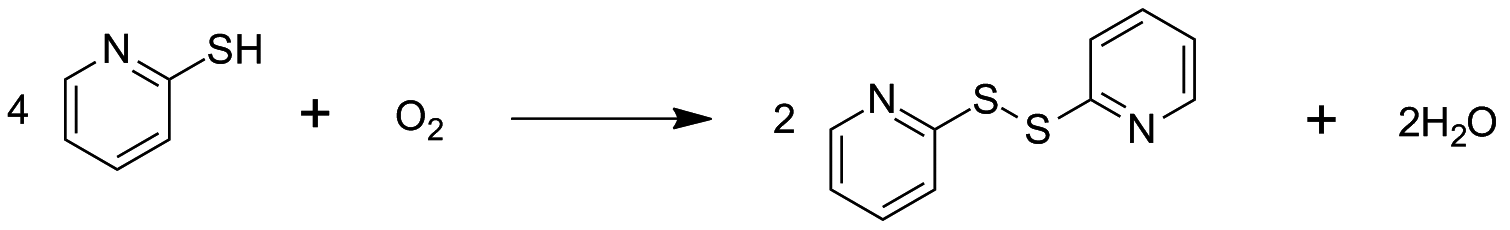

2-Mercaptopyridine can also be prepared by hydride reduction of 2,2'-dipyridyl disulfide.

C_{5}H_{4}NSSC_{5}H_{4}N + 2H → 2HSC_{5}H_{4}N

== Main reactions ==
2-Mercaptopyridine and the disulfide are precursors to the chelating ligand C_{5}H_{4}NS^{−}. This anion forms the indium(III) complex In(PyS)_{3} complex. 2-Mercaptopyridine has also been investigated as a reagent to purify plasmid DNA of impurities such as RNA and proteins at relatively quick timescales to similar methods. 2-Mercaptopyridine is also used acylate phenols, amines, and carboxylic acids.

2-Mercaptopyridine can be used as a catalyst for isodesmic C-H borylation of heteroarenes. The particular pattern of Lewis base and Brønsted acid allows to cleave boron-carbons bonds and then form a new boron-carbon bond by lewis pair mediated C-H activation.
