= Clorotepine =

Antipsychotic medication

Clinical data
- Trade names: Clotepin, Clopiben
- Other names: Octoclothepin; Octoclothepine; VUFB-6281; VUFB-10030
- Routes of administration: By mouth
- ATC code: None

Legal status
- Legal status: In general: ℞ (Prescription only)

Identifiers
- IUPAC name: 1-(8-chloro-10,11-dihydrodibenzo[b,f]thiepin-10-yl)-4-methylpiperazine
- CAS Number: 13448-22-1 4789-68-8 (maleate) 42505-79-3 (mesylate)
- PubChem CID: 1238
- ChemSpider: 1201
- UNII: E65W20MU7A
- ChEMBL: ChEMBL64249
- CompTox Dashboard (EPA): DTXSID7048451

Chemical and physical data
- Formula: C_{19}H_{21}ClN_{2}S
- Molar mass: 344.90 g·mol^{−1}
- 3D model (JSmol): Interactive image
- SMILES: Clc4cc2c(Sc1ccccc1CC2N3CCN(C)CC3)cc4
- InChI: InChI=1S/C19H21ClN2S/c1-21-8-10-22(11-9-21)17-12-14-4-2-3-5-18(14)23-19-7-6-15(20)13-16(17)19/h2-7,13,17H,8-12H2,1H3; Key:XRYLGRGAWQSVQW-UHFFFAOYSA-N

Clorotepine (INN; brand names Clotepin, Clopiben), also known as octoclothepin or octoclothepine, is an antipsychotic of the tricyclic group which was derived from perathiepin in 1965 and marketed in the Czech Republic by Spofa in or around 1971 for the treatment of schizophrenic psychosis.

Clorotepine is known to have high affinity for the dopamine D_{1}, D_{2}, D_{3}, and D_{4} receptors, the serotonin 5-HT_{2A}, 5-HT_{2B}, 5-HT_{2C}, 5-HT_{6}, and 5-HT_{7} receptors, the α_{1A}-, α_{1B}-, and α_{1D}-adrenergic receptors, and the histamine H_{1} receptors, where it has been it has been confirmed to act as an antagonist (or inverse agonist) at most sites (and likely is as such at all of them based on structure–activity relationships), and it also blocks the reuptake of norepinephrine via inhibition of the norepinephrine transporter.

Due to its very potent activity at the D_{2} receptor, along with tefludazine, clorotepine was used as the basis for developing a 3-dimensional (3D) pharmacophore for D_{2} receptor antagonists.

== See also ==
- Metitepine
- Perathiepin
