= Hexane-2,5-dione =

- Skeletal formula of hexane-2,5-dione

Names
- Preferred IUPAC name Hexane-2,5-dione
- Other names 1,2-Diacetylethane 'α','β'-Diacetylethane; Acetonyl acetone Diacetonyl; 2,5-Dioxohexane; 2,5-Diketohexane; 2,5-Hexanedione

Identifiers
| CAS Number | 110-13-4 |
| 3D model (JSmol) | Interactive image |
| ChEBI | CHEBI:85014 |
| ChemSpider | 7744 |
| ECHA InfoCard | 100.003.400 |
| EC Number | 203-738-3 |
| PubChem CID | 8035 |
| RTECS number | MO3150000 |
| UNII | C0Z8884J3P |
| UN number | 1224 |
| CompTox Dashboard (EPA) | DTXSID8030138 |
- InChI: InChI=1S/C6H10O2/c1-5(7)3-4-6(2)8/h3-4H2,1-2H3 Key: OJVAMHKKJGICOG-UHFFFAOYSA-N; InChI=1/C6H10O2/c1-5(7)3-4-6(2)8/h3-4H2,1-2H3 Key: OJVAMHKKJGICOG-UHFFFAOYAH
- SMILES: O=C(C)CCC(=O)C

Properties
| Chemical formula | C_{6}H_{10}O_{2} |
| Molar mass | 114.1438 g mol^{−1} |
| Appearance | colorless liquid |
| Density | 0.973 g cm^{−3}, liquid |
| Melting point | −5.5 °C (22.1 °F; 267.6 K) |
| Boiling point | 191.4 °C (376.5 °F; 464.5 K) |
| Solubility in water | ≥ 10 g/100 mL (22 °C) |
| Magnetic susceptibility (χ) | −62.51·10^{−6} cm^{3}/mol |

Structure
| Molecular shape | trigonal planar at carbonyl tetrahedral elsewhere |

Hazards
- GHS labelling
| Pictograms | (GHS07: Exclamation mark) (GHS08: Health hazard) |
| Signal word | Warning |
| Hazard statements | H315, H319, H373 |
| Precautionary statements | P260, P264, P280, P302+P352, P305+P351+P338, P314, P321, P332+P313, P337+P313, P362, P501 |
| Flash point | 78 °C (172 °F; 351 K) |

Related compounds
| Related diketones | acetylacetone |
- Except where otherwise noted, data are given for materials in their standard state (at 25 °C [77 °F], 100 kPa). verify (what is ?) Infobox references

2,5-Hexanedione (Acetonylacetone) is an aliphatic diketone. It is a colorless liquid. In humans, it is a toxic metabolite of hexane and of 2-hexanone.

== Symptoms of poisoning ==
The chronic toxicity of hexane is attributed to hexane-2,5-dione. The symptoms are tingling and cramps in the arms and legs, followed by general muscular weakness. In severe cases, atrophy of the skeletal muscles is observed, along with a loss of coordination and vision problems.

Similar symptoms are observed in animal models. They are associated with a degeneration of the peripheral nervous system (and eventually the central nervous system), starting with the distal portions of the longer and wider nerve axons.

== Mechanism of action ==
2,5-Hexanedione reacts with lysine residues in axonal proteins by Schiff base formation followed by cyclization to give pyrroles. Oxidation of the pyrrole residues then causes cross-linking and denaturation of proteins, which perturbs axonal transport and function and causes damage to nerve cells.

== Synthesis ==
2,5-Hexanedione has been prepared in several ways. A common method involves hydrolysis of 2,5-dimethylfuran, a glucose derived heterocycle.

== Uses ==
Acetonylacetone can be used in the synthesis of isocarboxazid, rolgamidine, and mopidralazine. Treatment with P_{4}S_{10} gives 2,5-dimethylthiophene.
