= Loxapine =

Atypical antipsychotic medication

Clinical data
- Trade names: Loxitane, Adasuve
- AHFS/Drugs.com: Monograph
- MedlinePlus: a682311
- License data: EU EMA: by INN; US DailyMed: Loxapine; US FDA: Loxapine
- Routes of administration: By mouth, inhalation, intramuscular
- Drug class: Antipsychotic
- ATC code: N05AH01 (WHO)

Legal status
- Legal status: AU: S4 (Prescription only); BR: Class C1 (Other controlled substances); US: ℞-only; EU: Rx-only

Pharmacokinetic data
- Protein binding: 96.8%
- Metabolism: Extensive Liver; active metabolites include amoxapine and 8-hydroxyloxapine. Inhibits P-gp and is a substrate of CYP1A2, CYP3A4 and CYP2D6
- Elimination half-life: 4 hours (oral); 7.61 hours (inhalation)
- Excretion: Majority are excreted within 24 hours, main route through urine (conjugated metabolites), small amounts through the feces (unconjugated metabolites)

Identifiers
- IUPAC name: 8-chloro-6-(4-methylpiperazin-1-yl)benzo[b][1,4]benzoxazepine
- CAS Number: 1977-10-2
- PubChem CID: 3964
- IUPHAR/BPS: 205
- DrugBank: DB00408
- ChemSpider: 3827
- UNII: LER583670J
- KEGG: D02340
- ChEBI: CHEBI:50841
- ChEMBL: ChEMBL831
- CompTox Dashboard (EPA): DTXSID7023229
- ECHA InfoCard: 100.016.215

Chemical and physical data
- Formula: C_{18}H_{18}ClN_{3}O
- Molar mass: 327.81 g·mol^{−1}
- 3D model (JSmol): Interactive image
- Melting point: 109 to 110 °C (228 to 230 °F)
- SMILES: Clc2ccc1Oc4c(/N=C(\c1c2)N3CCN(C)CC3)cccc4
- InChI: InChI=1S/C18H18ClN3O/c1-21-8-10-22(11-9-21)18-14-12-13(19)6-7-16(14)23-17-5-3-2-4-15(17)20-18/h2-7,12H,8-11H2,1H3; Key:XJGVXQDUIWGIRW-UHFFFAOYSA-N

Loxapine, sold under the brand names Loxitane and Adasuve (inhalation only) among others, is a tricyclic antipsychotic medication used primarily in the treatment of schizophrenia and bipolar disorder. It is a member of the dibenzoxazepine class and structurally very similar to Clotiapine and clozapine. Several researchers have argued that loxapine, initially classified as a typical antipsychotic, behaves as an atypical antipsychotic.

Loxapine may be metabolized by N-demethylation to amoxapine, a tricyclic antidepressant.

== Medical uses ==
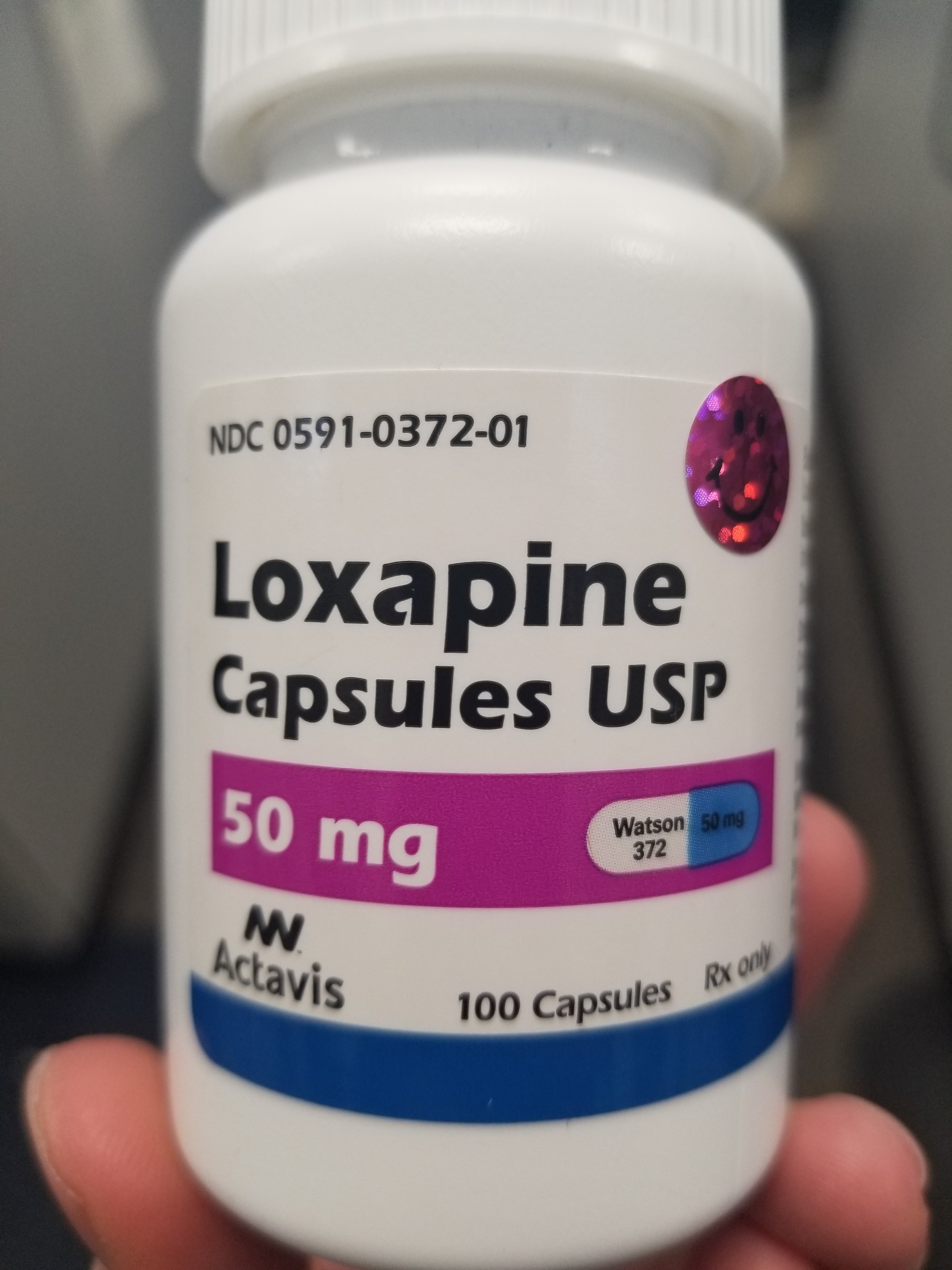
Bottle containing loxapine capsules, a mid-potency antipsychotic.

The US Food and Drug Administration (FDA) has approved loxapine inhalation powder for the acute treatment of agitation associated with schizophrenia or bipolar I disorder in adults.

A brief review of loxapine found no conclusive evidence that it was particularly effective in patients with schizophrenia. A subsequent systematic review considered that the limited evidence did not indicate a clear difference in its effects from other antipsychotics.

=== Available forms ===
Loxapine can be taken by mouth. It is also available as an intramuscular injection and as a powder for inhalation.

== Side effects ==
Loxapine can cause side effects that are generally similar to that of other antipsychotic medications. These include, e.g., gastrointestinal problems (like constipation and abdominal pain), cardiovascular problems (like tachycardia), moderate likelihood of drowsiness (relative to other antipsychotics), and movement problems (i.e. extrapyramidal symptoms [EPS]). At lower dosages its propensity for causing EPS appears to be similar to that of atypical antipsychotics. Although it is structurally similar to clozapine, it has much lower risk of agranulocytosis (which, even with clozapine, is 0.8%); however, mild and temporary fluctuations in blood leukocyte levels can occur. Abuse of loxapine has been reported.

The inhaled formulation of loxapine carries a low risk for a type of airway adverse reaction called bronchospasm that is not thought to occur when loxapine is taken by mouth.

== Pharmacology ==
=== Mechanism of action ===
Loxapine (and metabolite)
Site	LOX	AMX
5-HT_{1A}	2460	ND
5-HT_{1B}	388	ND
5-HT_{1D}	3470	ND
5-HT_{1E}	1400	ND
5-HT_{2A}	6.6	0.5
5-HT_{2C}	13	2 (rat)
5-HT_{3}	190	ND
5-HT_{5A}	780	ND
5-HT_{6}	31	50
5-HT_{7}	88	40 (rat)
α_{1A}	31	ND
α_{1B}	53	ND
α_{2A}	151	ND
α_{2B}	108	ND
α_{2C}	80	ND
β_{1}	10000+	ND
β_{2}	10000+	ND
M_{1}	120	ND
M_{2}	445	ND
M_{3}	211	ND
M_{4}	1270	ND
M_{5}	166	ND
D_{1}	54	ND
D_{2}	11	21
D_{3}	19	21
D_{4}	8.4	21
D_{5}	75	ND
H_{1}	2.2–4.9	7.9–25
H_{2}	208	ND
H_{3}	55000	>100,000
H_{4}	5050–8710	6,310
SERT	10000+	58
NET	5700	16
DAT	10000+	58
Values are K_{i} (nM). The smaller the value, the more strongly the drug binds to the site.

Some scientists say loxapine is a "mid-potency" typical antipsychotic. However, unlike most other typical antipsychotics, it has significant potency at the 5-HT_{2A} receptor (6.6 nM), which is similar to atypical antipsychotics like clozapine (5.35 nM). The higher likelihood of EPS with loxapine, compared to clozapine, may be due to its higher affinity for the dopamine D_{2} receptor (11 nM) compared to clozapine, which has one of the lowest binding affinities at the D_{2} receptor of any antipsychotic. Nevertheless, its higher affinity for 5-HT2A receptors over any of the dopamine receptors (54 nM for D1, 11 nM for D2, 19 nM for D3, 8.4 nM for D4 and 75 nM) makes it belong to atypical antipsychotic. On top of being an atypical antipsychotic, Amoxapine, one of the major metabolites of Loxapine, is a tricyclic antidepressant on its own right (though sometimes classified as tetracyclic antidepressant). It acts as Serotonin–norepinephrine reuptake inhibitor, and acts as moderate and strong reuptake inhibitor for Serotonin and Norepinephrine respectively. It also share with Loxapine an high affinity for 5-HT2 receptors, (0.5 nM, and 2.0 nM for 5-HT2A and 5-HT2C receptors respectively), while having lower affinity for D2 receptors (3.6 nm), retaining Loxapine's atypical antipsychotic properties. It has also significant binding affinity for 5-HT6 and 5-HT7 receptors, and Alpha-1 adrenergic receptor. This further emphasizes Loxapine's unique position as an atypical antipsychotic, if not the whole antipsychotic class, having antidepressants properties, through being metabolized into Amoxapine while retaining significant antipsychotic properties.

==== Use as an inhaled agitation medication ====
Loxapine has a relatively strong safety profile compared to similar antipsychotic drugs, such as quetiapine, olanzapine, and clozapine, with a relatively lower incidence of metabolic side-effects (although higher extrapyramial side-effects). Given its strong safety profile and speed/efficacy when given intramuscularly for acute agitation, an inhaled version of the drug (Adasuve) has been developed to be applied nasally for agitated patients needing to be rapidly de-escalated.

=== Pharmacokinetics ===
Loxapine is metabolized to amoxapine, as well as its 8-hydroxy metabolite (8-hydroxyloxapine). Amoxapine is further metabolized to its 8-hydroxy metabolite (8-hydroxyamoxapine), which is also found in the blood of people taking loxapine. At steady-state after taking loxapine by mouth, the relative amounts of loxapine and its metabolites in the blood is as follows: 8-hydroxyloxapine > 8-hydroxyamoxapine > loxapine.

The pharmacokinetics of loxapine change depending on how it is given. Intramuscular injections of loxapine lead to higher blood levels and area under the curve of loxapine than when it is taken by mouth.

== Chemistry ==
Loxapine is a dibenzoxazepine and is structurally very similar to clozapine, an atypical antipsychotic.

Chemical structures of loxapine and clozapine, with key differences highlighted.
