= Perathiepin =

Chemical compound

Clinical data
- ATC code: None

Identifiers
- IUPAC name: 1-(10,11-dihydrodibenzo[b,f]thiepin-10-yl)-4-methylpiperazine
- CAS Number: 1526-83-6
- PubChem CID: 107593
- ChemSpider: 96790
- UNII: YR8C4WXJ4T
- CompTox Dashboard (EPA): DTXSID20934555

Chemical and physical data
- Formula: C_{19}H_{22}N_{2}S
- Molar mass: 310.46 g·mol^{−1}
- 3D model (JSmol): Interactive image
- SMILES: S2c1ccccc1CC(c3c2cccc3)N4CCN(C)CC4
- InChI: InChI=1S/C19H22N2S/c1-20-10-12-21(13-11-20)17-14-15-6-2-4-8-18(15)22-19-9-5-3-7-16(17)19/h2-9,17H,10-14H2,1H3; Key:MYFNXITXHNLSJY-UHFFFAOYSA-N

Perathiepin is a neuroleptic drug of the tricyclic family which was developed in the 1960s but was never marketed. In animal studies it was found to possess central depressant, antihistamine, antiserotonergic, and analgesic effects.

== See also ==
- Clorotepine
- Metitepine
