= Fluperlapine =

Chemical compound

Clinical data
- ATC code: none

Identifiers
- IUPAC name: 3-fluoro-6-(4-methylpiperazin-1-yl)-11H-dibenzo[b,e]azepine
- CAS Number: 67121-76-0
- PubChem CID: 49381
- ChemSpider: 44882
- UNII: EWG253M961
- ChEMBL: ChEMBL63756
- CompTox Dashboard (EPA): DTXSID2046123

Chemical and physical data
- Formula: C_{19}H_{20}FN_{3}
- Molar mass: 309.388 g·mol^{−1}
- 3D model (JSmol): Interactive image
- SMILES: Fc4ccc3c(/N=C(/N1CCN(C)CC1)c2ccccc2C3)c4
- InChI: InChI=1S/C19H20FN3/c1-22-8-10-23(11-9-22)19-17-5-3-2-4-14(17)12-15-6-7-16(20)13-18(15)21-19/h2-7,13H,8-12H2,1H3; Key:OBWGMKKHCLHVIE-UHFFFAOYSA-N

Fluperlapine (NB 106-689), also known as fluoroperlapine, is a morphanthridine (11H-dibenzo[b,e]azepine) atypical antipsychotic with additional antidepressant and sedative effects. It was first synthesized in 1979, and then subsequently studied in animals and humans in 1984 and beyond, but despite demonstrating efficacy in the treatment of a variety of medical conditions including schizophrenia, psychosis associated with Parkinson's disease, depressive symptoms, and dystonia, it was never marketed. This was perhaps due to its capacity for producing potentially life-threatening agranulocytosis, similarly to clozapine, which it closely resembles both structurally and pharmacologically.

== Pharmacology ==
Binding profile

Receptor	K_{i} (nM)
5-HT_{2A}	7.9
5-HT_{2C}	18.2
5-HT_{6}	29
5-HT_{7}	4.6
M_{1}	8.8
M_{2}	71
M_{3}	41
M_{4}	14
M_{5}	17
D_{1}	85
D_{2}	316.2
D_{3}	254.7
D_{4}	21

== Synthesis ==
Patents:

3-fluoro-5,11-dihydro-6H-dibenz[b,e]azepin-6-one [62662-88-8] (3)

== See also ==
- List of investigational antipsychotics
- Clozapine
- Perlapine
