= Tampramine =

Chemical compound

Clinical data
- Routes of administration: Oral

Legal status
- Legal status: In general: uncontrolled

Identifiers
- IUPAC name: N,N-Dimethyl-3-(6-phenylpyrido[2,3-b][1,4]benzodiazepin-11-yl)propan-1-amine
- CAS Number: 83166-17-0 83166-18-1 (fumarate)
- PubChem CID: 54961
- ChemSpider: 49631
- UNII: 47GSE5RM8N
- CompTox Dashboard (EPA): DTXSID00232203

Chemical and physical data
- Formula: C_{23}H_{24}N_{4}
- Molar mass: 356.473 g·mol^{−1}
- 3D model (JSmol): Interactive image
- SMILES: CN(C)CCCN1c2ccccc2C(=Nc3c1nccc3)c4ccccc4

Tampramine (AHR-9,377) is a tricyclic antidepressant (TCA) which was developed in the 1980s but was never marketed. Despite being a TCA, it acts as a selective norepinephrine reuptake inhibitor and has negligible affinity for adrenergic, histaminergic, and muscarinic receptors. It was found to be effective in the forced swim test (FST) model of depression in animal studies but is not known to have ever been trialed in humans.

== See also ==
- Tricyclic antidepressant
