= Thiepine =

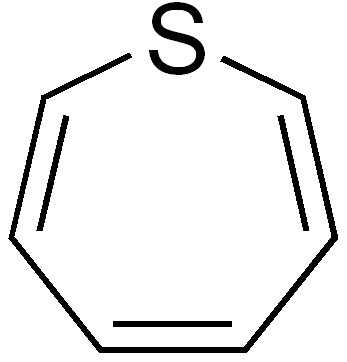

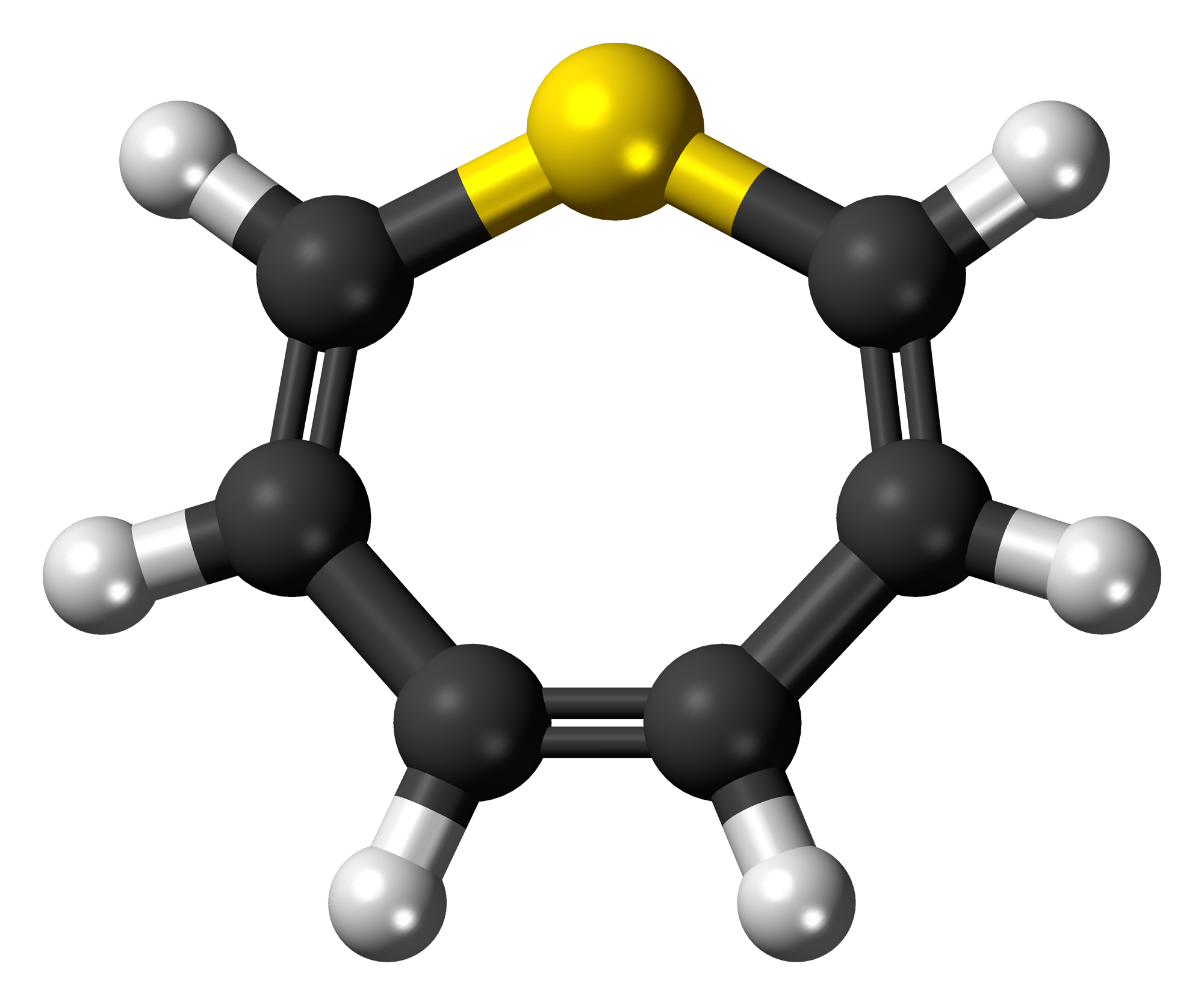

Names
- Preferred IUPAC name Thiepine
- Other names Thiatropilidene; Thiepin

Identifiers
CAS Number	291-72-5
3D model (JSmol)	Interactive image
ChemSpider	13299847
PubChem CID	12444286
UNII	5A9XLZ8CPE
CompTox Dashboard (EPA)	DTXSID10498494
- InChI: InChI=1S/C6H6S/c1-2-4-6-7-5-3-1/h1-6H Key: BISQTCXKVNCDDA-UHFFFAOYSA-N
- SMILES: S1C=CC=CC=C1

Properties
Chemical formula	C_{6}H_{6}S
Molar mass	110.17 g·mol^{−1}
- Except where otherwise noted, data are given for materials in their standard state (at 25 °C [77 °F], 100 kPa). verify (what is ?) Infobox references

In organic chemistry, thiepine (or thiepin) is an unsaturated seven-membered heterocyclic compound, with six carbon atoms and one sulfur atom. The parent compound, C_{6}H_{6}S is unstable and is predicted to be antiaromatic. Bulky derivatives have been isolated and shown by X-ray crystallography to have nonplanar C_{6}S ring.

Computational studies suggest that thiepine would eliminate a sulfur atom to form benzene. The intermediate is this process is the bicycle thianorcaradiene. In the complex with (η^{4}-C_{6}H_{6}S)Fe(CO)_{3}, the ring is stable.

Benzothiepines have one fused benzene group and dibenzothiepines such as dosulepin and zotepine have two fused benzene groups. Damotepine is another thiepin derivative.

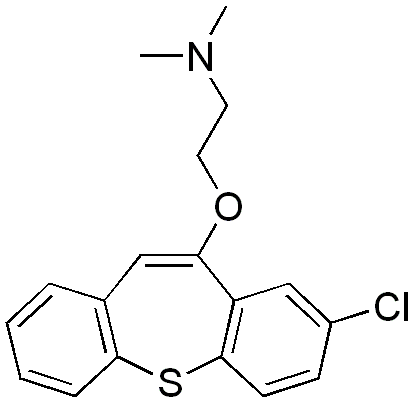
The chemical structure of the dibenzothiepine zotepine.

== See also ==
- Thiazepines
- 2,3-Dihydrothiepine
- 2,7-Dihydrothiepine
