= Calcium hydrosulfide =

Chemical compound

- Ca(SH)_{2}

Names
- IUPAC name Calcium hydrosulfide
- Other names Calcium hydrogensulfide Calcium hydrogen sulfide

Identifiers
CAS Number	15512-36-4https://haz-map.com/Agents/1592
3D model (JSmol)	Interactive image
ChemSpider	10737549
EC Number	235-209-8
PubChem CID	12906350
CompTox Dashboard (EPA)	DTXSID90923779
- InChI: InChI=1S/Ca.2H2S/h;2*1H2/q+2;;/p-2 Key: YAECNLICDQSIKA-UHFFFAOYSA-L
- SMILES: [SH-].[SH-].[Ca+2]

Properties
Chemical formula	Ca(SH)_{2}
Molar mass	105.922383 g/mol

Related compounds
Other anions	Calcium hydroxide Calcium polysulfide
Other cations	Ammonium hydrosulfide Sodium hydrosulfide
Related compounds	Calcium sulfide
- Except where otherwise noted, data are given for materials in their standard state (at 25 °C [77 °F], 100 kPa). Infobox references

Calcium hydrosulfide is the chemical compound with the formula Ca(HS)_{2} or CaH_{2}S_{2}. It is formed from the reaction of calcium hydroxide or calcium carbonate with hydrogen sulfide:

Ca(OH)_{2} + 2 H_{2}S → Ca(HS)_{2} + 2 H_{2}O

CaCO_{3} + 2 H_{2}S → Ca(HS)_{2} + H_{2}O + CO_{2}
