= YM-976 =

Names
- Preferred IUPAC name 4-(3-Chlorophenyl)-1,7-diethylpyrido[2,3-d]pyrimidin-2(1H)-one

Identifiers
CAS Number	191219-80-4
3D model (JSmol)	Interactive image
ChemSpider	5037176
IUPHAR/BPS	5292
PubChem CID	6604918
UNII	7GQT2M8W42
CompTox Dashboard (EPA)	DTXSID70424991
- InChI: InChI=1S/C17H16ClN3O/c1-3-13-8-9-14-15(11-6-5-7-12(18)10-11)20-17(22)21(4-2)16(14)19-13/h5-10H,3-4H2,1-2H3 Key: MNHXYNNKDDXKNP-UHFFFAOYSA-N
- SMILES: CCC1=NC2=C(C=C1)C(=NC(=O)N2CC)C3=CC(=CC=C3)Cl

Properties
Chemical formula	C_{17}H_{16}ClN_{3}O
Molar mass	313.79 g·mol^{−1}
- Except where otherwise noted, data are given for materials in their standard state (at 25 °C [77 °F], 100 kPa). Infobox references

YM-976 is a phosphodiesterase inhibitor.
