= 2,5-Dimethylthiophene =

Names
- Preferred IUPAC name 2,5-Dimethylthiophene

Identifiers
CAS Number	638-02-8
3D model (JSmol)	Interactive image
ChemSpider	11998
ECHA InfoCard	100.010.286
EC Number	211-313-9
PubChem CID	12514
UNII	V6DDX6WB12
CompTox Dashboard (EPA)	DTXSID2074295
- InChI: InChI=1S/C6H8S/c1-5-3-4-6(2)7-5/h3-4H,1-2H3 Key: GWQOOADXMVQEFT-UHFFFAOYSA-N
- SMILES: CC1=CC=C(S1)C

Properties
Chemical formula	C_{6}H_{8}S
Molar mass	112.19 g·mol^{−1}
Appearance	Colorless liquid
Density	0.9836 g/cm^{3}
Melting point	−62.6 °C (−80.7 °F; 210.6 K)
Boiling point	136.5 °C (277.7 °F; 409.6 K)

Hazards
- GHS labelling
Pictograms	(GHS07: Exclamation mark)
Signal word	Warning
Hazard statements	H226
Precautionary statements	P210, P233, P240, P241, P242, P243, P280, P303+P361+P353, P370+P378, P403+P235, P501
- Except where otherwise noted, data are given for materials in their standard state (at 25 °C [77 °F], 100 kPa). Infobox references

2,5-Dimethylthiophene is an organosulfur compound with the formula C_{4}H_{2}(CH_{3})_{2}S. It is one of four isomers of dimethylthiophene. A colorless liquid, it is prepared by sulfurization of hexane-2,5-dione. It is approved as a food flavouring additive in Europe.
