= Carburazepam =

Chemical compound

Clinical data
- ATC code: none

Identifiers
- IUPAC name: 10-chloro-6-methyl-5-oxo-2-phenyl-3,6-diazabicyclo[5.4.0]undeca-8,10,12-triene-3-carboxamide
- CAS Number: 59009-93-7
- PubChem CID: 68787
- ChemSpider: 62027
- UNII: 41622NK45V
- ChEMBL: ChEMBL2106492
- CompTox Dashboard (EPA): DTXSID20866726
- ECHA InfoCard: 100.055.941

Chemical and physical data
- Formula: C_{17}H_{16}ClN_{3}O_{2}
- Molar mass: 329.78 g·mol^{−1}
- 3D model (JSmol): Interactive image
- SMILES: ClC1=CC(C(C2=CC=CC=C2)N(CC(N3C)=O)C(N)=O)=C3C=C1
- InChI: InChI=InChI=1S/C17H16ClN3O2/c1-20-14-8-7-12(18)9-13(14)16(11-5-3-2-4-6-11)21(17(19)23)10-15(20)22/h2-9,16H,10H2,1H3,(H2,19,23); Key:HFFJORVBQWPILU-UHFFFAOYSA-N

Carburazepam is a drug which is a benzodiazepine derivative.
