= Metiapine =

Chemical compound

Clinical data
- Drug class: Typical antipsychotic

Identifiers
- IUPAC name: 8-methyl-6-(4-methylpiperazin-1-yl)benzo[b][1,4]benzothiazepine
- CAS Number: 5800-19-1
- PubChem CID: 22047
- ChemSpider: 20718
- UNII: 775D6D91J8
- KEGG: D02672
- ChEMBL: ChEMBL2106892
- CompTox Dashboard (EPA): DTXSID7020891

Chemical and physical data
- Formula: C_{19}H_{21}N_{3}S
- Molar mass: 323.46 g·mol^{−1}
- 3D model (JSmol): Interactive image
- SMILES: CC1=CC2=C(C=C1)SC3=CC=CC=C3N=C2N4CCN(CC4)C
- InChI: InChI=1S/C19H21N3S/c1-14-7-8-17-15(13-14)19(22-11-9-21(2)10-12-22)20-16-5-3-4-6-18(16)23-17/h3-8,13H,9-12H2,1-2H3; Key:IOEPXYJOHIZYGQ-UHFFFAOYSA-N

Metiapine is a typical antipsychotic medication of the dibenzothiazepine group. There is scarce research on the safety and efficacy of metiapine in humans, though limited human trials exist.

== Medical uses ==
Metiapine has been investigated for the treatment of schizophrenia.

== Side effects ==
Like other typical antipsychotics, it has a high rate of extrapyramidal side effects.

== Pharmacology ==
Metiapine has strong antidopaminergic effects and is classified as a typical (i.e., first-generation) antipsychotic.

== Chemistry ==
Metiapine is a dibenzothiazepine derivative. Like clothiapine, metiapine has a sulfur atom replacing the nitrogen atom found in dibenzodiazepine derivative antipsychotics like clozapine.

=== Synthesis ===
Metiapine can be synthesized through the following mechanism:

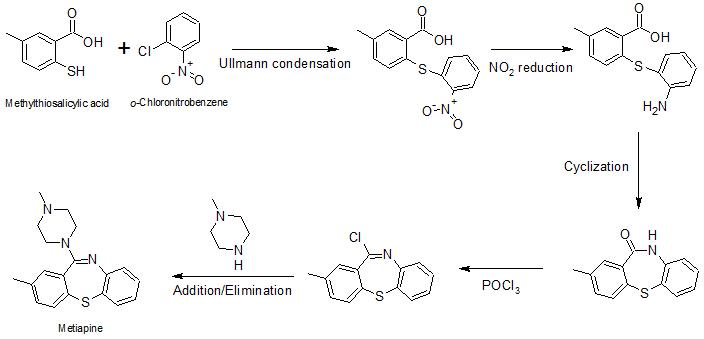

== History ==
Metiapine was first discovered in the 1970s by Marion Merrell Dow (now a part of Sanofi).

== Research ==
A 2017 Cochrane Review provided guidance for a double-blind, randomized controlled trial of metiapine versus chlorpromazine for the treatment of schizophrenia, though the authors acknowledged that it is unlikely that any future trials will investigate the use of metiapine in humans. The available evidence for the use of metiapine is very limited.
