= 1,3-Thiazepine =

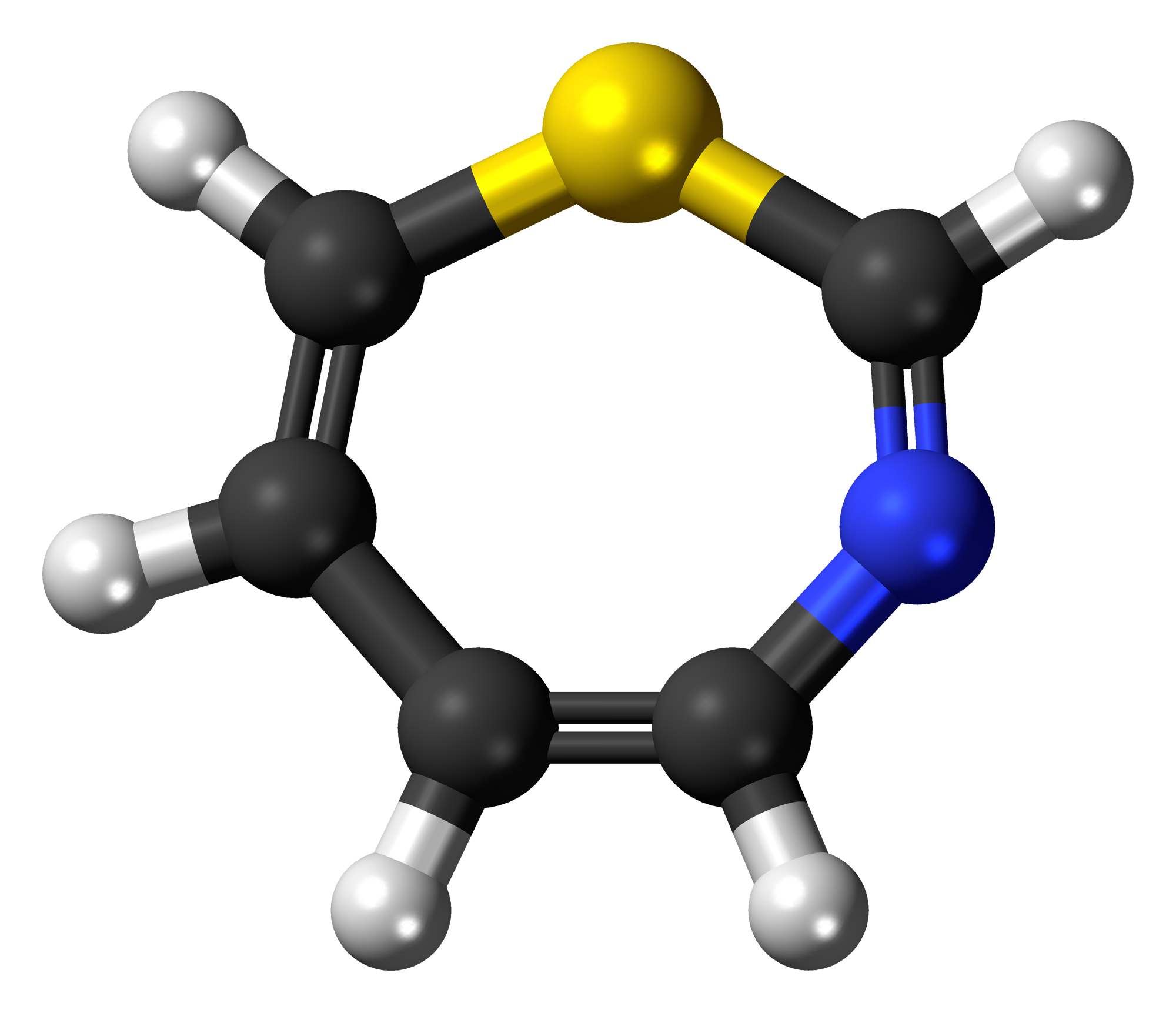

Names
- Preferred IUPAC name 1,3-Thiazepine

Identifiers
CAS Number	291-91-8
3D model (JSmol)	Interactive image; Interactive image
ChemSpider	10629932
PubChem CID	12444277
UNII	8HH39WF5RP
CompTox Dashboard (EPA)	DTXSID90498492
- InChI: InChI=1S/C5H5NS/c1-2-4-7-5-6-3-1/h1-5H Key: SIMIXFVGSWZJJV-UHFFFAOYSA-N; InChI=1/C5H5NS/c1-2-4-7-5-6-3-1/h1-5H Key: SIMIXFVGSWZJJV-UHFFFAOYAG
- SMILES: C1=CN=CSC=C1; C\1=C\C=C/N=C\S/1

Properties
Chemical formula	C_{5}H_{5}NS
Molar mass	111.1649
- Except where otherwise noted, data are given for materials in their standard state (at 25 °C [77 °F], 100 kPa). verify (what is ?) Infobox references

1,3-Thiazepine is a thiazepine, which is a seven-membered heterocyclic chemical compound containing nitrogen and carbon.
