= 7-Hydroxyamoxapine =

Chemical compound

Pharmacokinetic data
- Elimination half-life: 6.5 hours

Identifiers
- IUPAC name: 2-Chloro-11-(piperazin-1-yl)dibenzo [b,f][1,4]oxazepin-7-ol
- CAS Number: 37081-76-8
- PubChem CID: 162242
- ChemSpider: 142472
- UNII: 9Z11F654NR
- ChEBI: CHEBI:143288
- CompTox Dashboard (EPA): DTXSID00190576

Chemical and physical data
- Formula: C_{17}H_{16}ClN_{3}O_{2}
- Molar mass: 329.78 g·mol^{−1}
- 3D model (JSmol): Interactive image
- SMILES: C1CN(CCN1)C2=NC3=C(C=C(C=C3)O)OC4=C2C=C(C=C4)Cl
- InChI: InChI=1S/C17H16ClN3O2/c18-11-1-4-15-13(9-11)17(21-7-5-19-6-8-21)20-14-3-2-12(22)10-16(14)23-15/h1-4,9-10,19,22H,5-8H2; Key:MEUGUMOVYNSGEW-UHFFFAOYSA-N

7-Hydroxyamoxapine is an active metabolite of the antidepressant drug amoxapine (Asendin). It contributes to amoxapine's pharmacology. It is a dopamine receptor antagonist and contributes to amoxapine's antipsychotic properties.

== See also ==
- 8-Hydroxyamoxapine
