= 8-Hydroxyamoxapine =

Chemical compound

Pharmacokinetic data
- Elimination half-life: 30 hours

Identifiers
- IUPAC name: 8-chloro-6-piperazin-1-ylbenzo[b][1,4]benzoxazepin-3-ol
- CAS Number: 61443-78-5
- PubChem CID: 43656
- ChemSpider: 39784
- UNII: 0D4T741I48
- ChEBI: CHEBI:143289
- CompTox Dashboard (EPA): DTXSID40210388

Chemical and physical data
- Formula: C_{17}H_{16}ClN_{3}O_{2}
- Molar mass: 329.78 g·mol^{−1}
- 3D model (JSmol): Interactive image
- SMILES: C1CN(CCN1)C2=NC3=C(C=CC(=C3)O)OC4=C2C=C(C=C4)Cl
- InChI: InChI=1S/C17H16ClN3O2/c18-11-1-3-15-13(9-11)17(21-7-5-19-6-8-21)20-14-10-12(22)2-4-16(14)23-15/h1-4,9-10,19,22H,5-8H2; Key:QDWNOKXUZTYVGO-UHFFFAOYSA-N

8-Hydroxyamoxapine is an active metabolite of the antidepressant drug amoxapine (Asendin). It contributes to amoxapine's pharmacology. It is a serotonin-norepinephrine reuptake inhibitor (SNRI) with similar norepinephrine, but more serotonin, reuptake inhibition as its parent compound. It plays a part in balancing amoxapine's ratio of serotonin to norepinephrine transporter blockage.

== See also ==
- 7-Hydroxyamoxapine
