= 1,4-Thiazepine =

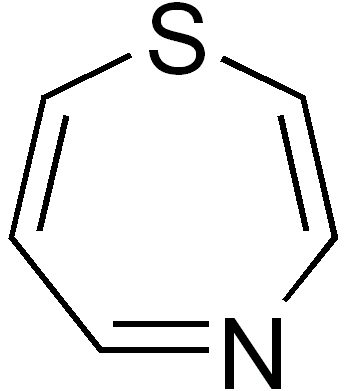

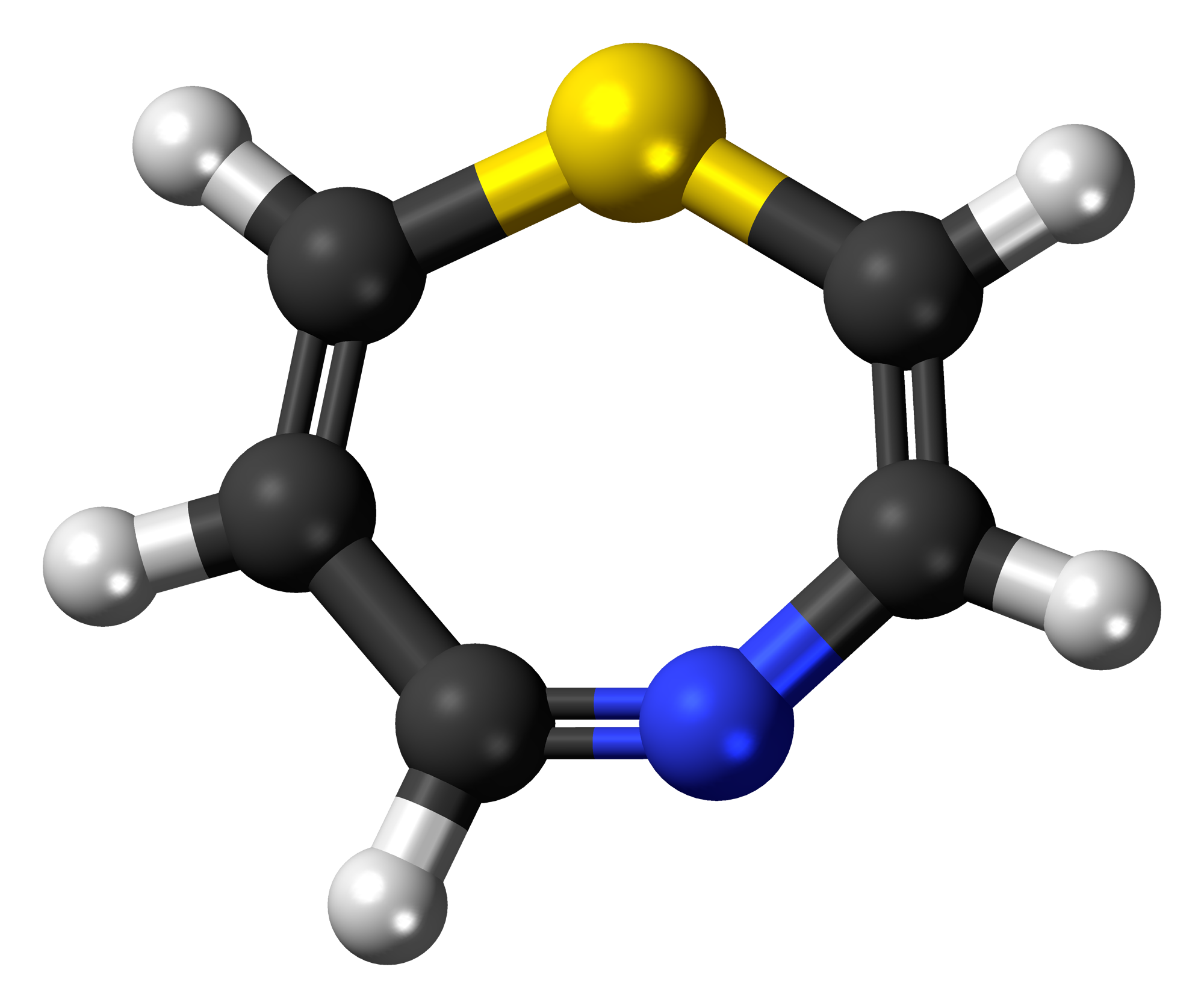

Names
- Preferred IUPAC name 1,4-Thiazepine

Identifiers
CAS Number	292-14-8
3D model (JSmol)	Interactive image; Interactive image
ChemSpider	11259752
PubChem CID	12444278
UNII	CP3LLG6M8Q
CompTox Dashboard (EPA)	DTXSID50498493
- InChI: InChI=1S/C5H5NS/c1-2-6-3-5-7-4-1/h1-5H Key: QPPOMEOQNLTFRU-UHFFFAOYSA-N; InChI=1/C5H5NS/c1-2-6-3-5-7-4-1/h1-5H Key: QPPOMEOQNLTFRU-UHFFFAOYAY
- SMILES: C1=CSC=CN=C1; C\1=C\C=N/C=C\S/1

Properties
Chemical formula	C_{5}H_{5}NS
Molar mass	111.16 g/mol
- Except where otherwise noted, data are given for materials in their standard state (at 25 °C [77 °F], 100 kPa). verify (what is ?) Infobox references

1,4-Thiazepine is a thiazepine. Diltiazem is based upon this structure.
