= 2,3-Dihydrothiepine =

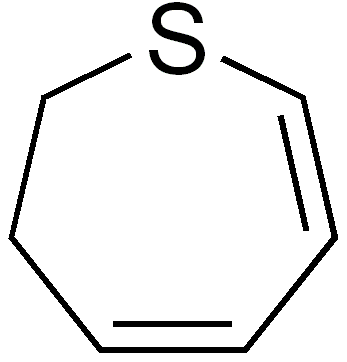

Names
- Preferred IUPAC name 2,3-Dihydrothiepine
- Other names 2,3-Dihydrothiepin

Identifiers
CAS Number	37996-46-6
3D model (JSmol)	Interactive image; Interactive image
ChemSpider	555889
PubChem CID	640540
UNII	RU8LFL7BFB
CompTox Dashboard (EPA)	DTXSID20348754
- InChI: InChI=1S/C6H8S/c1-2-4-6-7-5-3-1/h1-3,5H,4,6H2 Key: QSZUTAPGRWXHEO-UHFFFAOYSA-N; InChI=1/C6H8S/c1-2-4-6-7-5-3-1/h1-3,5H,4,6H2 Key: QSZUTAPGRWXHEO-UHFFFAOYAR
- SMILES: C1CSC=CC=C1; S1\C=C/C=C\CC1

Properties
Chemical formula	C_{6}H_{8}S
Molar mass	112.19 g/mol
- Except where otherwise noted, data are given for materials in their standard state (at 25 °C [77 °F], 100 kPa). verify (what is ?) Infobox references

2,3-Dihydrothiepine is a partially saturated analog of thiepine.
