= Amoxapine =

Tricyclic antidepressant medication

Clinical data
- Pronunciation: A-mox-a-peen
- Trade names: Asendin, others
- AHFS/Drugs.com: Monograph
- MedlinePlus: a682202
- License data: US FDA: Amoxapine
- Routes of administration: Oral
- ATC code: N06AA17 (WHO)

Legal status
- Legal status: AU: S4 (Prescription only); BR: Class C1 (Other controlled substances); US: ℞-only

Pharmacokinetic data
- Bioavailability: >60%
- Protein binding: 90%
- Metabolism: Hepatic (cytochrome P450 system)
- Elimination half-life: 8–10 hours (30 hours for chief active metabolite)
- Excretion: Renal (60%), feces (18%)

Identifiers
- IUPAC name: 2-chloro-11-(piperazin-1-yl)dibenzo[b,f][1,4]oxazepine
- CAS Number: 14028-44-5
- PubChem CID: 2170
- IUPHAR/BPS: 201
- DrugBank: DB00543
- ChemSpider: 2085
- UNII: R63VQ857OT
- KEGG: D00228
- ChEBI: CHEBI:2675
- ChEMBL: ChEMBL1113
- CompTox Dashboard (EPA): DTXSID7022598
- ECHA InfoCard: 100.034.411

Chemical and physical data
- Formula: C_{17}H_{16}ClN_{3}O
- Molar mass: 313.79 g·mol^{−1}
- 3D model (JSmol): Interactive image
- SMILES: Clc2ccc1Oc4c(/N=C(\c1c2)N3CCNCC3)cccc4
- InChI: InChI=1S/C17H16ClN3O/c18-12-5-6-15-13(11-12)17(21-9-7-19-8-10-21)20-14-3-1-2-4-16(14)22-15/h1-6,11,19H,7-10H2; Key:QWGDMFLQWFTERH-UHFFFAOYSA-N

Amoxapine, sold under the brand name Asendin among others, is a tricyclic antidepressant (TCA). It is the N-demethylated metabolite of loxapine. Amoxapine first received marketing approval in the United States in 1980, approximately 10 to 20 years after most of the other TCAs were introduced in the United States.

== Medical uses ==
Amoxapine is used in the treatment of major depressive disorder. Compared to other antidepressants it is believed to have a faster onset of action, with therapeutic effects seen within four to seven days. In excess of 80% of patients that do respond to amoxapine are reported to respond within two weeks of the beginning of treatment. It also has properties similar to those of the atypical antipsychotics, and may behave as one and thus may be used in the treatment of schizophrenia off-label. Despite its apparent lack of extrapyramidal side effects in patients with schizophrenia it has been found to worsen motor function in a study of three patients with Parkinson's disease and psychosis.

== Contraindications ==
As with all FDA-approved antidepressants it carries a black-box warning about the potential of an increase in suicidal thoughts or behaviour in children, adolescents and young adults under the age of 25. Its use is also advised against in individuals with known hypersensitivities to either amoxapine or other ingredients in its oral formulations. Its use is also recommended against in the following disease states:

- Severe cardiovascular disorders (potential of cardiotoxic adverse effects such as QT interval prolongation)
- Uncorrected narrow angle glaucoma
- Acute recovery post-myocardial infarction

Its use is also advised against in individuals concurrently on monoamine oxidase inhibitors or if they have been on one in the past 14 days and in individuals on drugs that are known to prolong the QT interval (e.g. ondansetron, citalopram, pimozide, sertindole, ziprasidone, haloperidol, chlorpromazine, thioridazine, etc.).

=== Lactation ===
Its use in breastfeeding mothers not recommended as it is excreted in breast milk and the concentration found in breast milk is approximately a quarter that of the maternal serum level.

== Side effects ==
Adverse effects by incidence:
Note: Serious (that is, those that can either result in permanent injury or are irreversible or are potentially life-threatening) are written in bold text.

Very common (>10% incidence) adverse effects include:

- Constipation
- Dry mouth
- Sedation

Common (1–10% incidence) adverse effects include:

- Anxiety
- Ataxia
- Blurred vision
- Confusion
- Dizziness
- Headache
- Fatigue
- Nausea
- Nervousness/restlessness
- Excessive appetite
- Rash
- Increased perspiration (sweating)
- Tremor
- Palpitations
- Nightmares
- Excitement
- Weakness
- ECG changes
- Oedema. An abnormal accumulation of fluids in the tissues of the body leading to swelling.
- Prolactin levels increased. Prolactin is a hormone that regulates the generation of breast milk. Prolactin elevation is not as significant as with risperidone or haloperidol.

Uncommon/Rare (<1% incidence) adverse effects include:

- Diarrhoea
- Flatulence
- **Hypertension** (high blood pressure)
- **Hypotension** (low blood pressure)
- Syncope (fainting)
- **Tachycardia** (high heart rate)
- Menstrual irregularity
- Disturbance of accommodation
- Mydriasis (pupil dilation)
- Orthostatic hypotension (a drop in blood pressure that occurs upon standing up)
- **Seizure**
- **Urinary retention** (being unable to pass urine)
- Urticaria (hives)
- Vomiting
- Nasal congestion
- Photosensitization
- **Hypomania** (a dangerously elated/irritable mood)
- Tingling
- Paresthesias of the extremities
- Tinnitus
- Disorientation
- Numbness
- Incoordination
- Disturbed concentration
- Epigastric distress
- Peculiar taste in the mouth
- Increased or decreased libido
- Impotence (difficulty achieving an erection)
- Painful ejaculation
- Lacrimation (crying without an emotional cause)
- Weight gain
- Altered liver function
- Breast enlargement
- Drug fever
- Pruritus (itchiness)
- **Vasculitis** a disorder where blood vessels are destroyed by inflammation. Can be life-threatening if it affects the right blood vessels.
- Galactorrhoea (lactation that is not associated with pregnancy or breast feeding)
- Delayed micturition (that is, delays in urination from when a conscious effort to urinate is made)
- **Hyperthermia** (elevation of body temperature; its seriousness depends on the extent of the hyperthermia)
- **Syndrome of inappropriate secretion of antidiuretic hormone** (SIADH) this is basically when the body's level of the hormone, antidiuretic hormone, which regulates the conservation of water and the restriction of blood vessels, is elevated. This is potentially fatal as it can cause electrolyte abnormalities including hyponatraemia (low blood sodium), hypokalaemia (low blood potassium) and hypocalcaemia (low blood calcium) which can be life-threatening.
- **Agranulocytosis** a drop in white blood cell counts. The white blood cells are the cells of the immune system that fight off foreign invaders. Hence agranulocytosis leaves an individual open to life-threatening infections.
- **Leukopaenia** the same as agranulocytosis but less severe.
- **Neuroleptic malignant syndrome** (a potentially fatal reaction to antidopaminergic agents, most often antipsychotics. It is characterised by hyperthermia, diarrhoea, tachycardia, mental status changes [e.g. confusion], rigidity, extrapyramidal side effects)
- **Tardive dyskinesia** a most often irreversible neurologic reaction to antidopaminergic treatment, characterised by involuntary movements of facial muscles, tongue, lips, and other muscles. It develops most often only after prolonged (months, years or even decades) exposure to antidopaminergics.
- Extrapyramidal side effects. Motor symptoms such as tremor, parkinsonism, involuntary movements, reduced ability to move one's voluntary muscles, etc.

Unknown incidence or relationship to drug treatment adverse effects include:

- **Paralytic ileus** (paralysed bowel)
- **Atrial arrhythmias** including **atrial fibrillation**
- **Myocardial infarction** (heart attack)
- **Stroke**
- **Heart block**
- **Hallucinations**
- Purpura
- Petechiae
- Parotid swelling
- Changes in blood glucose levels
- **Pancreatitis** swelling of the pancreas
- **Hepatitis** swelling of the liver
- Urinary frequency
- Testicular swelling
- Anorexia (weight loss)
- Alopecia (hair loss)
- **Thrombocytopenia** a significant drop in platelet count that leaves one open to life-threatening bleeds.
- Eosinophilia an elevated level of the eosinophils of the body. Eosinophils are the type of immune cell that's job is to fight off parasitic invaders.
- **Jaundice** yellowing of the skin, eyes and mucous membranes due to an impaired ability of the body to clear the by product of haem breakdown, bilirubin, most often the result of liver damage as it is the liver's responsibility to clear bilirubin.

It tends to produce less anticholinergic effects, sedation and weight gain than some of the earlier TCAs (e.g. amitriptyline, clomipramine, doxepin, imipramine, trimipramine). It may also be less cardiotoxic than its predecessors.

== Overdose ==
It is considered particularly toxic in overdose, with a high rate of renal failure (which usually takes 2–5 days), rhabdomyolysis, coma, seizures and even status epilepticus. Some believe it to be less cardiotoxic than other TCAs in overdose, although reports of cardiotoxic overdoses have been made.

== Pharmacology ==
=== Pharmacodynamics ===
Amoxapine
Site	K_{i} (nM)	Species	Ref
SERT	58	Human	
NET	16	Human	
DAT	4,310	Human	
5-HT_{2A}	0.5	Human	
5-HT_{2C}	2.0	Monkey	
5-HT_{6}	6.0–50	Human	
5-HT_{7}	41	Monkey	
α_{1}	50	Human	
α_{2}	2,600	Human	
D_{2}	3.6–160	Human	
D_{3}	11	Human	
D_{4}	2.0–40	Human	
H_{1}	7.9–25	Human	
H_{2}	ND	ND	ND
H_{3}	>100,000	Human	
H_{4}	6,310	Human	
DOR	ND	Hamster	
mACh	1,000	Human	
Values are K_{i} (nM). The smaller the value, the more strongly the drug binds to the site.

Amoxapine possesses a wide array of pharmacological effects. It is a moderate and strong reuptake inhibitor of serotonin and norepinephrine, respectively, and binds to the 5-HT_{2A}, 5-HT_{2B}, 5-HT_{2C}, 5-HT_{3}, 5-HT_{6}, 5-HT_{7}, D_{2}, α_{1}-adrenergic, D_{3}, D_{4}, and H_{1} receptors with varying but significant affinity, where it acts as an antagonist (or inverse agonist depending on the receptor in question) at all sites. It has weak but negligible affinity for the dopamine transporter and the 5-HT_{1A}, 5-HT_{1B}, D_{1}, α_{2}-adrenergic, H_{4}, mACh, and GABA_{A} receptors, and no affinity for the β-adrenergic receptors or the allosteric benzodiazepine site on the GABA_{A} receptor. Amoxapine is also a weak GlyT2 blocker, as well as a weak (K_{i} = 2.5 μM, EC_{50} = 0.98 μM) δ-opioid receptor partial agonist.

7-Hydroxyamoxapine, a major active metabolite of amoxapine, is a more potent dopamine receptor antagonist and contributes to its neuroleptic efficacy, whereas 8-Hydroxyamoxapine is a norepinephrine reuptake inhibitor but a stronger serotonin reuptake inhibitor and helps to balance amoxapine's ratio of serotonin to norepinephrine transporter blockade.

=== Pharmacokinetics ===
Amoxapine is metabolised into two main active metabolites: 7-hydroxyamoxapine and 8-hydroxyamoxapine.

Amoxapine

7-hydroxyamoxapine

8-hydroxyamoxapine

Compound	t_{1/2} (hr)	t_{max} (hr)	C_{SS} (ng/mL)	Protein binding	V_{d}	Excretion
Amoxapine	8	1-2	17-93 ng/mL (divided dosing), 13-209 ng/mL (single daily dosing)	90%	0.9-1.2 L/kg	Urine (60%), feces (18%)
8-hydroxyamoxapine	30	5.3 (single dosing)	158-512 ng/mL (divided dosing), 143-593 ng/mL (single dose)	?	?	?
7-hydroxyamoxapine	6.5	2.6-5.4 (single dosing)	?	?	?	?

Where:

- t_{1/2} is the elimination half life of the compound.
- t_{max} is the time to peak plasma levels after oral administration of amoxapine.
- C_{SS} is the steady state plasma concentration.
- protein binding is the extent of plasma protein binding.
- V_{d} is the volume of distribution of the compound.

== Society and culture ==
=== Brand names ===
Brand names for amoxapine include (where † denotes discontinued brands):

- Adisen (KR)
- Amolife (IN)
- Amoxan (JP)
- Asendin† (previously marketed in CA, NZ, US)
- Asendis† (previously marketed in IE, UK)
- Défanyl (FR)
- Demolox (DK†, IN, ES†)
- Oxamine (IN)
- Oxcap (IN)

== See also ==
- Loxapine
