= 2,7-Dihydrothiepine =

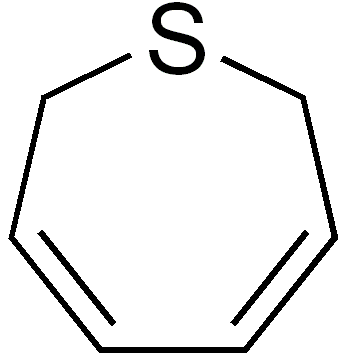

Names
- Preferred IUPAC name 2,7-Dihydrothiepine
- Other names 2,7-Dihydrothiepin

Identifiers
CAS Number	37996-47-7
3D model (JSmol)	Interactive image; Interactive image
ChemSpider	555890
PubChem CID	640541
UNII	8QYR4JZ8ZG
CompTox Dashboard (EPA)	DTXSID80348755
- InChI: InChI=1S/C6H8S/c1-2-4-6-7-5-3-1/h1-4H,5-6H2 Key: PHKNVGRJVJKPQQ-UHFFFAOYSA-N; InChI=1/C6H8S/c1-2-4-6-7-5-3-1/h1-4H,5-6H2 Key: PHKNVGRJVJKPQQ-UHFFFAOYAG
- SMILES: C1C=CC=CCS1; S1C/C=C\C=C/C1

Properties
Chemical formula	C_{6}H_{8}S
Molar mass	112.19 g/mol
- Except where otherwise noted, data are given for materials in their standard state (at 25 °C [77 °F], 100 kPa). verify (what is ?) Infobox references

2,7-Dihydrothiepine is a partially saturated analog of thiepine.
