= Clotiapine =

Antipsychotic medication

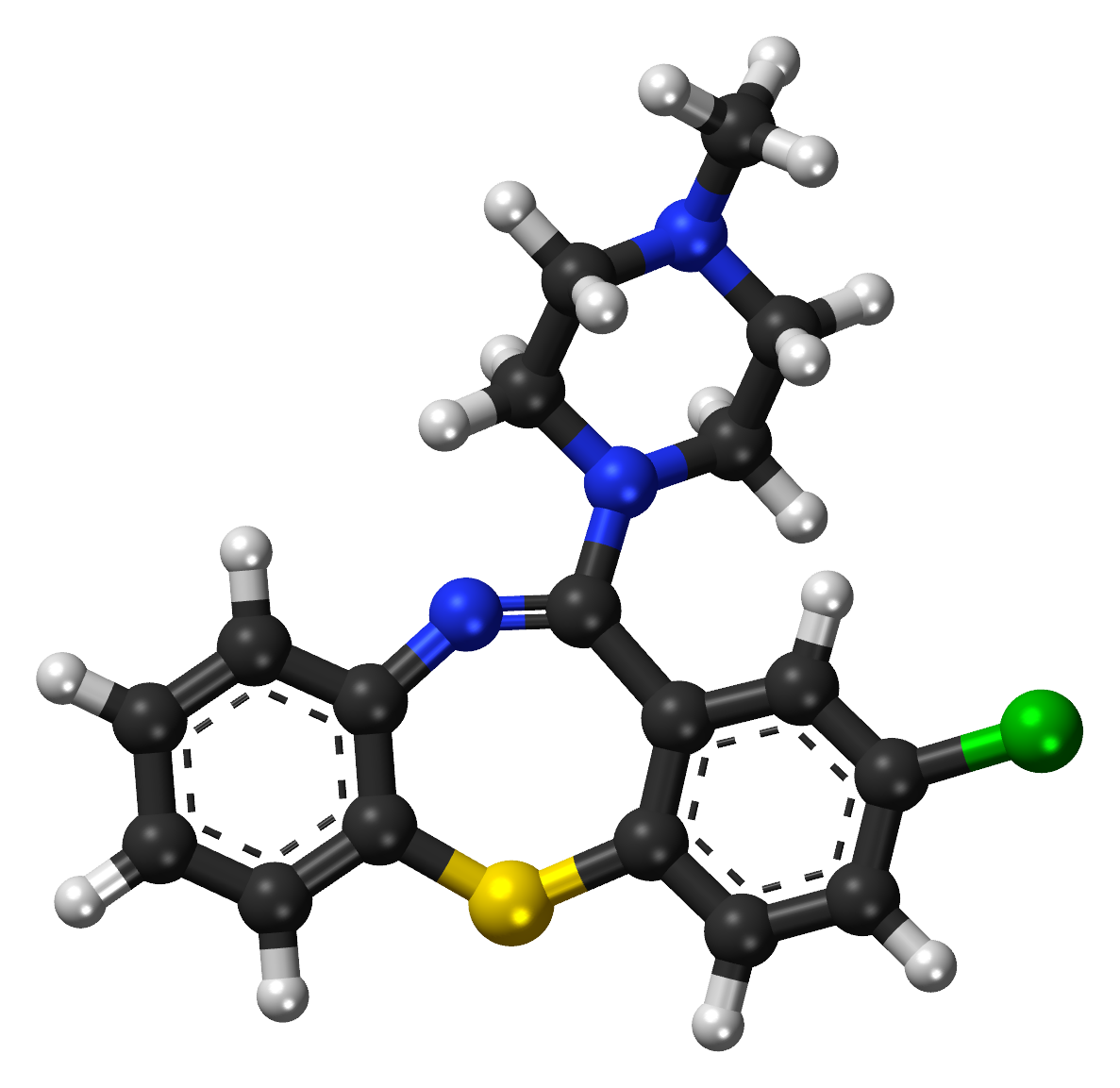

Clinical data
- Trade names: Etumina, Etumine, Entumin, Etomine, Entumine
- AHFS/Drugs.com: International Drug Names
- Routes of administration: Oral, Intravenous and Intramuscular
- ATC code: N05AH06 (WHO)

Legal status
- Legal status: BR: Class C1 (Other controlled substances); In general: ℞ (Prescription only)

Identifiers
- IUPAC name: 8-chloro-6-(4-methylpiperazin-1-yl)benzo[b][1,4]benzothiazepine
- CAS Number: 2058-52-8
- PubChem CID: 16351
- ChemSpider: 15510
- UNII: Z05HCY0X1T
- KEGG: D01597
- ChEBI: CHEBI:108591
- ChEMBL: ChEMBL304902
- CompTox Dashboard (EPA): DTXSID5022851
- ECHA InfoCard: 100.016.512

Chemical and physical data
- Formula: C_{18}H_{18}ClN_{3}S
- Molar mass: 343.87 g·mol^{−1}
- 3D model (JSmol): Interactive image
- SMILES: Clc2ccc1Sc4c(/N=C(\c1c2)N3CCN(C)CC3)cccc4
- InChI: InChI=1S/C18H18ClN3S/c1-21-8-10-22(11-9-21)18-14-12-13(19)6-7-16(14)23-17-5-3-2-4-15(17)20-18/h2-7,12H,8-11H2,1H3; Key:KAAZGXDPUNNEFN-UHFFFAOYSA-N

Clotiapine (Entumine) is an atypical antipsychotic of the dibenzothiazepine chemical class. It was first introduced in a few European countries (namely, Belgium, Italy, Spain and Switzerland), Argentina, Taiwan and Israel in 1970.

Some sources regard clotiapine as a typical antipsychotic rather than atypical due to its high incidence of extrapyramidal side effects compared to the atypicals like clozapine and quetiapine, to which it is structurally related. Despite the relativity high rate of undesired effects it has demonstrated efficacy in treatment-resistant individuals with schizophrenia according to a number of psychiatrists with clinical experience with it, some weak clinical evidence supports this view too. A systematic review performed by Cochrane compared clotiapine with other antipsychotic drugs:

Clotiapine compared to other antipsychotic drugs for acute psychotic illnesses
Summary
There was no evidence to support or refute the use of clotiapine in preference to other antipsychotic drug treatments for management of people with acute psychotic illness.

Outcome	Findings in words	Findings in numbers	Quality of evidence
General clinical impression
No significant improvement	There is no clear difference between people given clotiapine and those receiving other antipsychotic drugs for acute psychotic illnesses. These findings are based on data of low quality.	RR 0.88 (0.39 to 1.98)	Low
Not well enough to be discharged	Clotiapine is not clearly different to other antipsychotic drugs for this outcome - for people who are acutely unwell. These findings are based on data of low quality.	RR 1.04 (0.93 to 1.16)	Low
Adverse effects
Movement disorders - use of antiparkinsonian medication	Clotiapine may reduce the use of antiparkinsonian drugs - implying that clotiapine causes less of this effect, but, at present it is not possible to be confident about the difference between the two treatments and data supporting this finding are very limited.	RR 0.43 (0.05 to 3.53)	Very low
Seizure	Clotiapine may increase the risk of fits, but, the difference between the two treatments is not clear. This finding is based on data of low quality.	RR 3.67 (0.16 to 84.66)	Low
Satisfaction with care
Leaving the study early - any reason	There is no clear difference between people given clotiapine and those receiving other antipsychotics for acute psychotic illnesses. These findings are based on data of low quality.	RR 2.09 (0.81 to 5.42)	Low
	No study reported any data on outcomes as sedation and information relating to behavioral outcomes such as tranquillisation.		Clotiapine increases very fast weight, like approximately in 6 or 7 days of the start, so it is convenient to speak with your doctor it this happens.

A fatal case of urinary retention associated with this drug has been reported in literature.
