= Thiazepine =

Drug class

1,3-thiazepine

1,4-thiazepine

Diltiazem. 1,4-thiazepine is the seven membered ring in the middle.

Thiazepines are substituted thiepins, with a nitrogen replacing a carbon in the seven-membered heterocyclic compound. Depending on the location of the nitrogen, one distinguishes 1,3-thiazepine and 1,4-thiazepine.

Benzothiazepines have a single benzene attached to the ring, while dibenzothiazepines have two. Diltiazem, a benzothiazepine, is a calcium channel blocker intermediate in properties between verapamil and the dihydropyridines. It is used to treat variant angina (Prinzmetal's angina), either naturally occurring or drug-induced and stable angina.
