= PR-000608 =

Dopamine reuptake inhibitor

Clinical data
- Other names: PR 000608

Identifiers
- IUPAC name: 1-(4,4-Bis(4-fluorophenyl)butyl)-4-(2-hydroxy-3-phenylaminopropyl)piperazine
- CAS Number: 143759-63-1
- PubChem CID: 3072701
- ChemSpider: 2332014
- ChEMBL: ChEMBL58192

Chemical and physical data
- Formula: C_{29}H_{35}F_{2}N_{3}
- Molar mass: 463.617 g·mol^{−1}
- 3D model (JSmol): Interactive image
- SMILES: C1CN(CCN1CCCC(C2=CC=C(C=C2)F)C3=CC=C(C=C3)F)CC(CNC4=CC=CC=C4)O
- InChI: InChI=1S/C29H35F2N3O/c30-25-12-8-23(9-13-25)29(24-10-14-26(31)15-11-24)7-4-16-33-17-19-34(20-18-33)22-28(35)21-32-27-5-2-1-3-6-27/h1-3,5-6,8-15,28-29,32,35H,4,7,16-22H2; Key:YIBOKAQCZWKXIM-UHFFFAOYSA-N

PR-608 is a potent dopamine reuptake inhibitor belonging to the diphenylbutylpiperazine class of agents (related to the diphenylbutylpiperidine class). Other members of this class include amperozide, lidoflazine, difluanazine, FG5865 and FG-5893.

Some sources claim PR-608 is related to vanoxerine. However, it is important to make the distinction that the GBR class of agents are known to be derived from diphenhydramine (or more specifically flunamine) as exemplified by S-350. The agents of this class all bear a benzhydryl-ethyl-ether functional group.

PR-608 was invented and developed in Japan and was patented in the 1990's to Pola Orbis Holdings Inc.

== Structure–activity relationship (SAR) ==
The most potent compound in the study was claimed to be 16. This had a DAT IC50 of 1.75 nM. The chemical name of this compound is 1-[3-[N,N-Bis(4-fluorophenyl)amino]propyl]-4-[2-hydroxy-3-(phenylamino)propyl]piperazine, PC9808585. This makes the compound virtually identical to PR-608 but has the benzhydryl carbon replaced by a tertiary nitrogen. What this means though is that it provides a site for metabolic deactivation resulting in a shorter half-life, although this remains conjectural.

== Research ==
PR-608 has been shown in preclinical studies to inhibit dopamine uptake in the central nervous system and may have potential applications in neuropsychiatric and cardiovascular disorders. For example, the compounds were shown to produce a marked increase in locomotor activity (LMA), without a marked decrease in blood pressure. Although PR-608 and vanoxerine showed an identical 2nM IC50 affinity for the DAT, in vivo microdialysis studies showed that PR-608 produced much more robust increases in extracellular dopamine than vanoxerine did. For example, 0.03 mmol/kg of PR-608 gave an elevation in DA of >3000% of basal values. In contrast, 0.1 mmol/kg of GBR12909 only led to ca. 1200% of basal dopamine.

The calcium channel blocking properties of PR-608 might make it useful as a cardiac stimulant for the treatment of heart disease or as a cerebral vasodilator. Alternative applications of this agent include for the treatment of psychostimulant addiction, neurodegenerative diseases including (but not limited to) Parkinson's disease, and as a treatment for depression. Since dopamine regulates the appetite, PR-608 might also find use for treating binge eating disorder (BED) as well as treating narcolepsy.

== Synthesis ==
PR-608 synthesis

The reaction of Ethyl phenylcarbamate (Phenylurethane) [101-99-5] (1) with epibromohydrin gives ethyl-N-(oxiran-2-ylmethyl)-N-phenylcarbamate, PC20325389 (2). Oxirane ring opening with 1-[4,4-bis(4-fluorophenyl)butyl]piperazine [5631-35-6] (3) occurs at the less sterically occluded end of the molecule giving Ethyl (3-{4-[4,4-bis(4-fluorophenyl)butyl]piperazin-1-yl}-2-hydroxypropyl)phenylcarbamate [143760-30-9] (4). Alkaline hydrolysis occurs to give PR-608 (5).

== See also ==
- JJC8-088
