= 1-Benzyl-4-(2-(diphenylmethoxy)ethyl)piperidine =

1-Benzyl-4-[2-(diphenylmethoxy)ethyl]piperidine

Names
- Preferred IUPAC name 1-Benzyl-4-[2-(diphenylmethoxy)ethyl]piperidine

Identifiers
CAS Number	174643-75-5
3D model (JSmol)	Interactive image
ChEMBL	ChEMBL338733
ChemSpider	8127716
PubChem CID	9952105
UNII	N3ZVN378F4
CompTox Dashboard (EPA)	DTXSID80433271
- InChI: InChI=1S/C27H31NO/c1-4-10-24(11-5-1)22-28-19-16-23(17-20-28)18-21-29-27(25-12-6-2-7-13-25)26-14-8-3-9-15-26/h1-15,23,27H,16-22H2 Key: WRSJONWBAYSODC-UHFFFAOYSA-N; InChI=1/C27H31NO/c1-4-10-24(11-5-1)22-28-19-16-23(17-20-28)18-21-29-27(25-12-6-2-7-13-25)26-14-8-3-9-15-26/h1-15,23,27H,16-22H2 Key: WRSJONWBAYSODC-UHFFFAOYAC
- SMILES: O(C(c1ccccc1)c2ccccc2)CCC4CCN(Cc3ccccc3)CC4

Properties
Chemical formula	C_{27}H_{31}NO
Molar mass	385.551 g·mol^{−1}
- Except where otherwise noted, data are given for materials in their standard state (at 25 °C [77 °F], 100 kPa). verify (what is ?) Infobox references

1-Benzyl-4-[2-(diphenylmethoxy)ethyl]piperidine is a stimulant of the piperidine class which acts as a potent and selective dopamine reuptake inhibitor. It is closely related to vanoxerine and GBR-12,935, which in contrast are piperazines.

== See also ==
- Vanoxerine
- GBR-12,935
- Desoxypipradrol
