= C19H22N2 =

The molecular formula C_{19}H_{22}N_{2} (molar mass: 278.39 g/mol) may refer to:

- Depramine
- Eburnamenine
- Methadone intermediate
- Pericine
- Triprolidine
