= Iminodibenzyl =

Names
- Other names 10,11-Dihydro-5H-dibenzo[b,f]azepine

Identifiers
3D model (JSmol)	Interactive image
ChEMBL	ChEMBL63054
ChemSpider	9886
ECHA InfoCard	100.007.080
EC Number	207-787-1
PubChem CID	10308
UNII	262BX7OE3U
CompTox Dashboard (EPA)	DTXSID8049414
- InChI: InChI=1S/C14H13N/c1-3-7-13-11(5-1)9-10-12-6-2-4-8-14(12)15-13/h1-8,15H,9-10H2 Key: ZSMRRZONCYIFNB-UHFFFAOYSA-N
- SMILES: C1CC2=CC=CC=C2NC3=CC=CC=C31

Properties
Chemical formula	C_{14}H_{13}N
Molar mass	195.26 g/mol
Density	g/cm^{3} (20°C)
- Except where otherwise noted, data are given for materials in their standard state (at 25 °C [77 °F], 100 kPa). Infobox references

Iminodibenzyl is an aromatic organic compound with a multitude of uses in medicinal chemistry. Iminodibenzyl is a fundamental building block used mainly in the construction of tricyclic antidepressants. Chemically speaking, it is almost the same as for iminostilbene, but differs in that the 2 carbon bridge between the two phenyl rings is saturated (with hydrogen), and does not contain an olefin.

== Applications ==

1. DDD-025
2. Bonnecor
3. Carbamazepine
4. Carpipramine
5. Ciclopramine
6. Cianopramine
7. Clomipramine & Clocapramine & Mosapramine
8. Depramine
9. Desipramine & Didesipramine [2095-95-6]
10. Homopipramol
11. Imipramine & Imipraminoxide
12. Ketipramine
13. Lofepramine
14. Metapramine
15. Opipramol
16. Oxcarbazepine
17. Quinupramine
18. Trimipramine

== Synthesis ==
The synthesis of iminodibenzyl has been discussed:

The treatment of 2-Nitrotoluene [88-72-2] (1) with amyl nitrite or Isopentyl formate [110-45-2] and potassium tert-butoxide resulted in an “oxidative coupling” to give 2,2'-Dinitrodibenzyl [16968-19-7] (2). Catalytic hydrogenation of both nitro groups gives 2,2'-Ethylenedianiline [34124-14-6] (4). Treatment with phosphoric acid then completes the synthesis of iminodibenzyl (5).

Additional Chinese patents:
