= GBR-12783 =

Names
- Preferred IUPAC name 1-[2-(Diphenylmethoxy)ethyl]-4-[(2E)-3-phenylprop-2-en-1-yl]piperazine

Identifiers
CAS Number	145428-33-7; 67469-57-2 (non-specific)
3D model (JSmol)	Interactive image
ChEBI	CHEBI:92594
ChEMBL	ChEMBL1612198
ChemSpider	4702243
PubChem CID	5788723
UNII	96Y892TJ2A
CompTox Dashboard (EPA)	DTXSID50860833 DTXSID2043741, DTXSID50860833
- InChI: InChI=1S/C28H32N2O/c1-4-11-25(12-5-1)13-10-18-29-19-21-30(22-20-29)23-24-31-28(26-14-6-2-7-15-26)27-16-8-3-9-17-27/h1-17,28H,18-24H2/b13-10+ Key: XFBDGHFDKJITGC-JLHYYAGUSA-N; InChI=1/C28H32N2O/c1-4-11-25(12-5-1)13-10-18-29-19-21-30(22-20-29)23-24-31-28(26-14-6-2-7-15-26)27-16-8-3-9-17-27/h1-17,28H,18-24H2/b13-10+ Key: XFBDGHFDKJITGC-JLHYYAGUBU
- SMILES: C1CN(CCN1CCOC(C2=CC=CC=C2)C3=CC=CC=C3)C/C=C/C4=CC=CC=C4

Properties
Chemical formula	C_{28}H_{32}N_{2}
Molar mass	396.578 g·mol^{−1}
- Except where otherwise noted, data are given for materials in their standard state (at 25 °C [77 °F], 100 kPa). Infobox references

GBR-12783 is a psychostimulant which acts as a selective dopamine reuptake inhibitor.

== See also ==
- Vanoxerine
- GBR-12935
- GBR-13069
- GBR-13098
- DBL-583
- LR-1111
- S-350 (drug)
