= LR-1111 =

Dopamine reuptake inhibitor

Clinical data
- Other names: LR 1111

Identifiers
- IUPAC name: 1-(2-benzhydryloxyethyl)-4-(3-phenylpropyl)-1,4-diazepane
- PubChem CID: 164487
- ChemSpider: 144200
- ChEMBL: ChEMBL142953
- CompTox Dashboard (EPA): DTXSID00164479

Chemical and physical data
- Formula: C_{29}H_{36}N_{2}O
- Molar mass: 428.620 g·mol^{−1}
- 3D model (JSmol): Interactive image
- SMILES: C1CN(CCN(C1)CCOC(C2=CC=CC=C2)C3=CC=CC=C3)CCCC4=CC=CC=C4
- InChI: InChI=1S/C29H36N2O/c1-4-12-26(13-5-1)14-10-19-30-20-11-21-31(23-22-30)24-25-32-29(27-15-6-2-7-16-27)28-17-8-3-9-18-28/h1-9,12-13,15-18,29H,10-11,14,19-25H2; Key:IRSSQYPVPPWBSQ-UHFFFAOYSA-N

LR-1111 is an analog of GBR-12935 that was discovered by Richard Rothman and co-workers in the 1990s. It differs from GBR-12935 in that the piperazine has been expanded to a homopiperazine (azepane) ring. LR-1111 is a dopamine reuptake inhibitor (DRI) with over 4000 times selectivity for the dopamine transporter (DAT) relative to the serotonin transporter (SERT) and the norepinephrine transporter (NET).

== See also ==
- Vanoxerine
- GBR-12935
- GBR-13069
- GBR-13098
- S-350 (drug)
