= Diphenylbutylpiperidine =

Class of typical antipsychotic drugs

Base chemical structure of the diphenylbutylpiperidine antipsychotics.

Diphenylbutylpiperidines are a class of typical antipsychotic drugs which were all synthesized, developed, and marketed by Janssen Pharmaceutica.

They include:

- Clopimozide (R-29,764)
- Fluspirilene (Redeptin)
- Penfluridol (Semap, Micefal, Longoperidol)
- Pimozide (Orap)

Additionally, Hoechst discovered R-56109 bearing the pendant ω-difluorophenylbutyl sidechain The piperidine portion of the molecule (R-56109) is of interest because it serves dual use in the synthesis of risperidone, paliperidone, ocaperidone, iloperidone, abaperidone and S18327. R-56109 was first invented by Hoechst (not Janssen) and appeared in a pair of patents on the butyrophenone design in 1982.

== Diphenylbutylpiperazines ==
Incorporating an additional nitrogen atom into the heterocyclic ring gives the closely related diphenylbutylpiperazines.

Examples of this include:

- Amperozide (antipsychotic)
- Lidoflazine
- PR-000608
- FG5865
- FG-5893
- Mioflazine
- Difluanazine
