= Psychopharmacology revolution =

Introduction of psychiatric drugs into clinical practice

The psychopharmacology revolution covers the introduction of various psychiatric drugs into clinical practice as well as their continued development. Although not exclusively limited to the 1950s, the literature tends to suggest that this decade was a particularly fruitful time for CNS drug discovery and it has been referred to as a "golden era".

== Chlorpromazine ==
The history of chlorpromazine can be traced back to the work of BASF who were creating dyes at around the turn of the 20th century (cf. methylene blue). It was found that attaching basic side chains to the tricyclic phenothiazine residue resulted in compounds that functioned as reliable antihistamines.

Henri Laborit was first using chlorpromazine to treat the anxiety of patients prior to surgery. He noted the so-called "indifference" that this agent causes and suggested that it be used on agitated psychotic patients.

Chlorpromazine has H1, M1, and α1 receptor antagonist activity. This causes sedation, anticholinergic effects, as well as orthostatic hypotension. It also functions as a blocker of D2 receptors, although it is much weaker and less selective than haloperidol in this respect. Blockade of the D2 receptors is thought to underlie the antipsychotic effect of the typical antipsychotics. However, in the case of atypicals such as clozapine and risperidone, blockade of 5HT2A receptors are thought to also account for an important part of their pharmacology.

Minor chemical manipulations in the chemical structure of chlorpromazine was used to create novel antipsychotic agents such as thioridazine and fluoperazine.

== Imipramine ==
Minor chemical manipulations in the structure of chlorpromazine led to the first tricyclic antidepressant (TCA), imipramine (Tofranil), whose structure is iminodibenzyl (dibenzazepine) based.

Imipramine was first used on agitated psychotic patients, but it was shown that in the majority of cases their condition did not improve and actually worsened slightly. However, it was noted that a few of the patients who were depressed became more animated so its use in the treatment of depression became apparent.

Due to the chemical similarity of imipramine to chlorpromazine, this agent also functions as a H1, M1, and α1 receptor antagonist. Imipramine is also known to function as a fast sodium channel blocker, which is said to account for the cardiotoxicity of this agent. The collective effect of imipramine on these receptors is not thought to contribute to its therapeutic activity in the treatment of depression, although it is believed to account for mostly all of its side effects.

The usefulness of the TCAs in treating depression is thought to stem from their ability to inhibit the uptake of the neurotransmitters serotonin (5-HT) and noradrenaline (NA). It was proposed that designing agents that were more selective for 5-HT and/or NA would lower the incidence of side effects. This in turn has led to the development/discovery of the SSRIs and SNRIs.

== Iproniazid ==
The so-called golden era also covers the discovery of the first monoamine oxidase inhibitor, iproniazid (Marsilid), which is hydrazine based. Like imipramine, this also was used in the treatment of depression.

Iproniazid was the result of a failed medicinal chemistry attempt to improve on the anti-tubercular activity of isoniazid. It was first given to patients with tuberculosis where a surprising but wholly unexpected improvement in mood was noticed. Nathan Kline coined the term "psychic energizer" to account for this effect and posited that they be used in the treatment of depression.

Iproniazid is no longer used because it caused an unacceptable incidence in jaundice. Nevertheless, related agents such as phenelzine and isocarboxazid are still on the market.

In addition, tranylcypromine is a non-hydrazine containing irreversible inhibitor of MAO which is also available.

A limitation of these agents is their potential to cause hypertension so their safety is not guaranteed. However, it seems that the selective inhibitor of the B isoform of MAO, selegiline, is much less likely to cause hypertension.

== Theory of mood disorders ==
The investigations into the mechanism of activity of these agents that followed their discovery led to the proposal of the "chemical imbalance" of neurotransmitters theory of mood disorders, which is supposed to account for the pathophysiology and/or pathogenesis of these states. It follows that these so-called "imbalances" can be corrected by the judicious application of appropriately selected psychotropic medication(s).

An excess of dopamine is cited as the cause of schizophrenia, whereas a deficiency of noradrenaline and serotonin were cited as the cause for depression.

The discovery of reserpine was also of great significance to the development of the monoamine amine theory of depression.

== Prior to the 1950s ==
Prior to the introduction of these agents, the management of mental disorders in America relied mainly on "psychoanalytic" methods said to be deriving from a "Freudian" understanding of the subject area. Apparently, there was great resistance to the use of medicine in the treatment of mental disorders prior to the 1950s. It is, however, known that various other agents including amphetamine and opium have documented use in the history of treating depression, and that barbiturates, lithium salts, bromide salts, various anticholinergic alkaloids, as well as opium, were all used in the history of the treatment of schizophrenia.
