= C22H26N2O4 =

The molecular formula C_{22}H_{26}N_{2}O_{4} (molar mass: 382.5 g/mol) may refer to:

- Akuammine
- AOH1996
- Aspidophytine
- Corymine
- Tofisopam, a benzodiazepine derivative
