= C21H25NO2 =

The molecular formula C_{21}H_{25}NO_{2} (molar mass: 323.43 g/mol) may refer to:

- 4-Hydroxy-1-methyl-4-(4-methylphenyl)-3-piperidyl 4-methylphenyl ketone
- PEPAP, an opioid analgesic
- Piperidolate, an antimuscarinic
