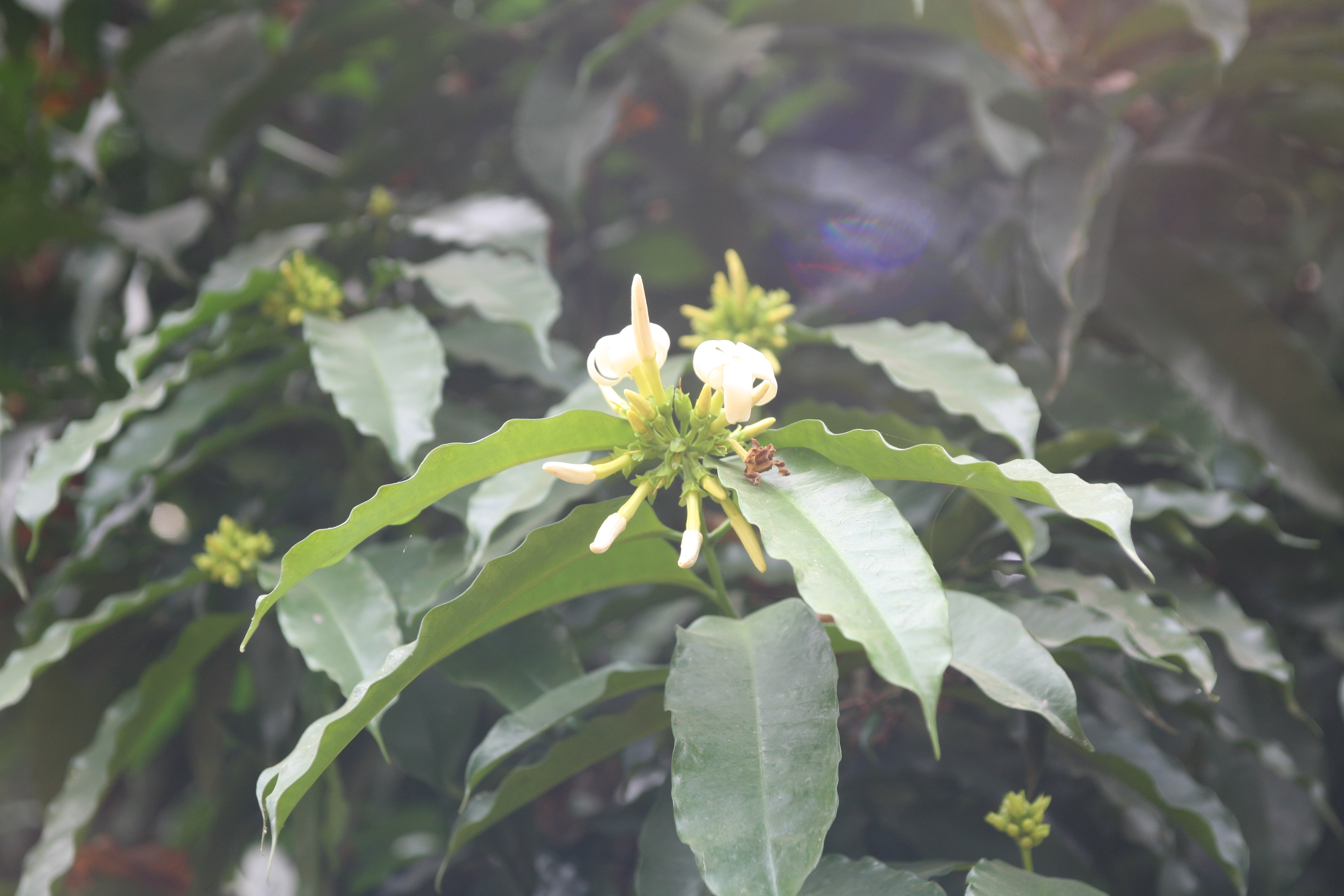

Scientific classification
- Kingdom: Plantae
- Clade: Tracheophytes
- Clade: Angiosperms
- Clade: Eudicots
- Clade: Asterids
- Order: Gentianales
- Family: Apocynaceae
- Subfamily: Rauvolfioideae
- Tribe: Hunterieae
- Genus: Picralima; Pierre
- Species: P. nitida

Binomial name
- Picralima nitida (Stapf) T.Durand & H.Durand

Synonyms
- Tabernaemontana nitida Stapf; Picralima klaineana Pierre; Picralima macrocarpa A.Chev.

= Picralima =

Genus of flowering plants

Picralima is a plant genus in the family Apocynaceae, first described as a genus in 1896. It contains only one known species, Picralima nitida (synonym Picralima klaineana), native to tropical Africa (Benin, Ghana, Ivory Coast, Nigeria, Gabon, Cameroon, Cabinda, Central African Republic, Republic of Congo, Zaire, Uganda).

Picralima nitida, the akuamma, is a tree. The dried seeds from this plant are used in traditional medicine throughout West Africa, particularly in Ghana as well as in the Ivory Coast and Nigeria. The plant produces the alkaloids pericine and akuammine, among others. Alkaloids discovered in this plant also include picraline [2671-32-1].

Several of these alkaloids were shown to bind to opioid receptors with weak affinity in vitro, and two compounds, akuammidine and ψ-akuammigine, were found to be μ-opioid agonists, although not particularly selective. More recently, it has been shown that an additional constitutive analog, acuammicine, has potent activity as a kappa opioid receptor agonist.

formerly included in genus

1. Picralima elliotii (Stapf) Stapf = Hunteria umbellata (K.Schum.) Hallier f.
2. Picralima gracilis A.Chev. = Hunteria umbellata (K.Schum.) Hallier f.
3. Picralima laurifolia A.Chev. = Hunteria simii (Stapf) H.Huber
4. Picralima umbellata (K.Schum.) Stapf = Hunteria umbellata (K.Schum.) Hallier f.
