= Mioflazine =

Cardiac drug

Clinical data
- Other names: R 51469

Identifiers
- IUPAC name: 1-[4,4-bis(4-fluorophenyl)butyl]-4-[2-(2,6-dichloroanilino)-2-oxoethyl]piperazine-2-carboxamide
- CAS Number: 79467-23-5
- PubChem CID: 72001
- ChemSpider: 65001
- UNII: 8YF140A099
- ChEMBL: ChEMBL2110980
- CompTox Dashboard (EPA): DTXSID00868521

Chemical and physical data
- Formula: C_{29}H_{30}Cl_{2}F_{2}N_{4}O_{2}
- Molar mass: 575.48 g·mol^{−1}
- 3D model (JSmol): Interactive image
- SMILES: C1CN(C(CN1CC(=O)NC2=C(C=CC=C2Cl)Cl)C(=O)N)CCCC(C3=CC=C(C=C3)F)C4=CC=C(C=C4)F
- InChI: InChI=1S/C29H30Cl2F2N4O2/c30-24-4-1-5-25(31)28(24)35-27(38)18-36-15-16-37(26(17-36)29(34)39)14-2-3-23(19-6-10-21(32)11-7-19)20-8-12-22(33)13-9-20/h1,4-13,23,26H,2-3,14-18H2,(H2,34,39)(H,35,38); Key:VWXFUOAKGNJSBI-UHFFFAOYSA-N

Mioflazine (R 51469) is a compound that has garnered attention due to its potential protective effects against myocardial ischemia. Primarily acting as a nucleoside transport inhibitor, mioflazine has been shown in preclinical studies to improve cardiac survival during ischemic episodes, modulate the dynamics of nucleoside accumulation during reperfusion, and exhibit unique pharmacological properties without significant inotropic effects.

Mioflazine is a member of diphenylbutylpiperazine class. Other members of this class include lidoflazine, draflazine, and soluflazine. R57974 has the same structure as mioflazine but is based on a 5,5-bis(4-fluorophenyl)pentyl] pendant sidechain.

== Synthesis ==
A patented procedure for mioflazine was released, and described in a book:

(Ex XXV inter. 83; Ex XXXI inter. 115; Ex XXXIII inter. 125; Ex XXXV cmp. 27).

The first step involves reacting Piperazine-2-carboxamide [84501-64-4] (1) with acetone to form a cyclic aminal protecting group thus forming hexahydro-3,3-dimethylimidazo(1,5-a)pyrazin-1(5H)-one [83898-63-9] (2). The vacant piperazine secondary nitrogen is reacted with 2-Chloro-N-(2,6-dichlorophenyl)acetamide [3644-56-2] (3) giving N-(2,6-dichlorophenyl)hexahydro-3,3-dimethyl-1-oxoimidazo[1,5-a]pyrazine-7(1H)-acetamide [83898-62-8] (4). Acid hydrolysis removal of the cyclic aminal protecting group gives 3-Carbamoyl-N-(2,6-dichlorophenyl)piperazine-1-acetamide [83863-78-9] (5). The unmasked remaining piperazine secondary nitrogen is alkylated with 1,1'-(4-Iodobutylidene)bis(4-fluorobenzene) [51787-79-2] (6), completing the synthesis of mioflazine (7).
