= GBR-13069 =

Names
- Preferred IUPAC name 1-{2-[Bis(4-fluorophenyl)methoxy]ethyl}-4-[(2E)-3-phenylprop-2-en-1-yl]piperazine

Identifiers
CAS Number	67469-43-6
3D model (JSmol)	Interactive image
ChEMBL	ChEMBL286991
ChemSpider	4767934
PubChem CID	5974189
UNII	VNS6D6QMEP
CompTox Dashboard (EPA)	DTXSID7043742
- InChI: InChI=1S/C28H30F2N2O/c29-26-12-8-24(9-13-26)28(25-10-14-27(30)15-11-25)33-22-21-32-19-17-31(18-20-32)16-4-7-23-5-2-1-3-6-23/h1-15,28H,16-22H2/b7-4+ Key: DASHZBBQOARCMQ-QPJJXVBHSA-N; InChI=1/C28H30F2N2O/c29-26-12-8-24(9-13-26)28(25-10-14-27(30)15-11-25)33-22-21-32-19-17-31(18-20-32)16-4-7-23-5-2-1-3-6-23/h1-15,28H,16-22H2/b7-4+ Key: DASHZBBQOARCMQ-QPJJXVBHBX
- SMILES: C1CN(CCN1CCOC(C2=CC=C(C=C2)F)C3=CC=C(C=C3)F)C/C=C/C4=CC=CC=C4

Properties
Chemical formula	C_{28}H_{30}F_{2}N_{2}O
Molar mass	448.558 g·mol^{−1}
- Except where otherwise noted, data are given for materials in their standard state (at 25 °C [77 °F], 100 kPa). Infobox references

GBR-13069 is a psychostimulant and selective dopamine reuptake inhibitor.

== See also ==
- Vanoxerine
- GBR-12783
- GBR-12935
- GBR-13098
- DBL-583
- LR-1111
- S-350 (drug)
