= Clopimozide =

Chemical compound

Clinical data
- ATC code: none

Identifiers
- IUPAC name: 3-[1-[4,4-bis(4-fluorophenyl)butyl]-4-piperidyl]-6-chloro-1H-benzimidazol-2-one
- CAS Number: 53179-12-7
- PubChem CID: 65449
- ChemSpider: 58909
- UNII: 7C6TA32SD2
- KEGG: D02649
- ChEMBL: ChEMBL2104161
- CompTox Dashboard (EPA): DTXSID60201238

Chemical and physical data
- Formula: C_{28}H_{28}ClF_{2}N_{3}O
- Molar mass: 496.00 g·mol^{−1}
- 3D model (JSmol): Interactive image
- SMILES: Fc1ccc(cc1)C(c2ccc(F)cc2)CCCN5CCC(N4c3ccc(Cl)cc3NC4=O)CC5
- InChI: InChI=1S/C28H28ClF2N3O/c29-21-7-12-27-26(18-21)32-28(35)34(27)24-13-16-33(17-14-24)15-1-2-25(19-3-8-22(30)9-4-19)20-5-10-23(31)11-6-20/h3-12,18,24-25H,1-2,13-17H2,(H,32,35); Key:JCZYXTVBWHAWLL-UHFFFAOYSA-N

Clopimozide (R-29,764) is a typical antipsychotic drug of the diphenylbutylpiperidine class. It is very potent and has an extremely long duration of action, lasting at least one week with a single dose. It was developed by Janssen Pharmaceutica but was never marketed.

== See also ==
- Typical antipsychotic
- Diphenylbutylpiperidine
