= Metapramine =

Chemical compound

Clinical data
- Trade names: Prodastene, Timaxel
- Routes of administration: Oral
- ATC code: none

Legal status
- Legal status: In general: ℞ (Prescription only)

Pharmacokinetic data
- Elimination half-life: 7–8 hours

Identifiers
- IUPAC name: (rac)-10,11-dihydro-N,5-dimethyl-5H-dibenz[b,f]azepin-10-amine
- CAS Number: 21730-16-5
- PubChem CID: 65700
- ChemSpider: 59127
- UNII: 303954M7YF
- CompTox Dashboard (EPA): DTXSID60865011

Chemical and physical data
- Formula: C_{16}H_{18}N_{2}
- Molar mass: 238.334 g·mol^{−1}
- 3D model (JSmol): Interactive image
- Chirality: Racemic mixture
- SMILES: CNC1CC2=C(C=CC=C2)N(C)C3=CC=CC=C31

Metapramine (brand names Prodastene, Timaxel) is a tricyclic antidepressant (TCA) developed by Rhone Poulenc that was introduced for the treatment of depression in France in 1984. In addition to its efficacy against affective disorders, it also has analgesic properties, and may be useful in the treatment of pain.

Metapramine has desipramine-like effects, acting as a norepinephrine reuptake inhibitor without affecting the reuptake of serotonin or dopamine. It has also been shown to act as a low-affinity NMDA receptor antagonist. Metapramine's direct effects on serotonin, histamine, and muscarinic acetylcholine receptors have not been assayed, but uniquely among most TCAs, it has anecdotally been reported to lack anticholinergic effects.

== Synthesis ==
A pair of syntheses has been reported in the patent literature:

The hydroboration between iminostilbene (1) and N,N-diethylaminoborane (2) gives 10-borohydro-5-methyl-10,11-dihydro-dibenzo[b,f]azepine (3). This is treated with methylchloramine (4), completing the synthesis of metapramine (5).
