= S-350 (drug) =

Psychoanaleptic piperazine

Identifiers
- IUPAC name: 3-[4-[2-[(4-fluorophenyl)-phenylmethoxy]ethyl]piperazin-1-yl]propanoic acid
- CAS Number: 61897-04-9
- PubChem CID: 3046248
- ChemSpider: 2308883
- ChEMBL: ChEMBL290645

Chemical and physical data
- Formula: C_{22}H_{27}FN_{2}O_{3}
- Molar mass: 386.467 g·mol^{−1}
- 3D model (JSmol): Interactive image
- SMILES: C1CN(CCN1CCC(=O)O)CCOC(C2=CC=CC=C2)C3=CC=C(C=C3)F
- InChI: InChI=1S/C22H27FN2O3/c23-20-8-6-19(7-9-20)22(18-4-2-1-3-5-18)28-17-16-25-14-12-24(13-15-25)11-10-21(26)27/h1-9,22H,10-17H2,(H,26,27); Key:YHKKVXZGTGCXTP-UHFFFAOYSA-N

S-350 is a psychostimulating (psychoanaleptic) piperazine. The pharmacological outcome is based on the structure of antihistamines related to diphenhydramine. S-350 is of historic significance since it can be viewed as the logical progenitor or harbinger to vanoxerine and other GBR agents that were discovered in short succession. The drug comes in 16 millimeter pills, and can help treat substance abuse in individuals.

== See also ==
- Vanoxerine
- GBR-12935
- GBR-13069
- GBR-13098
- LR-1111
