= GBR-12935 =

Chemical compound

Identifiers
- IUPAC name: 1-(2-(diphenylmethoxy)ethyl)-4-(3-phenylpropyl)piperazine
- CAS Number: 76778-22-8
- PubChem CID: 3456
- IUPHAR/BPS: 4639
- ChemSpider: 3338
- UNII: 9J9974WIBA
- ChEBI: CHEBI:64093
- ChEMBL: ChEMBL26320
- CompTox Dashboard (EPA): DTXSID2043743

Chemical and physical data
- Formula: C_{28}H_{34}N_{2}O
- Molar mass: 414.593 g·mol^{−1}
- 3D model (JSmol): Interactive image
- SMILES: C1CN(CCN1CCCC2=CC=CC=C2)CCOC(C3=CC=CC=C3)C4=CC=CC=C4
- InChI: InChI=1S/C28H34N2O/c1-4-11-25(12-5-1)13-10-18-29-19-21-30(22-20-29)23-24-31-28(26-14-6-2-7-15-26)27-16-8-3-9-17-27/h1-9,11-12,14-17,28H,10,13,18-24H2; Key:RAQPOZGWANIDQT-UHFFFAOYSA-N

GBR-12935 is a piperazine derivative which is a potent and selective dopamine reuptake inhibitor. It was originally developed in its ^{3}H radiolabelled form for the purpose of mapping the distribution of dopaminergic neurons in the brain by selective labelling of dopamine transporter proteins. This has led to potential clinical uses in the diagnosis of Parkinson's disease, although selective radioligands such as Ioflupane (^{123}I) are now available for this application. GBR-12935 is now widely used in animal research into Parkinson's disease and the dopamine pathways in the brain.

== See also ==
- LR-1111
- Vanoxerine
- GBR-12783
- GBR-13069
- GBR-13098
- DBL-583
- S-350 (drug)
