= Mosapramine =

Antipsychotic medication

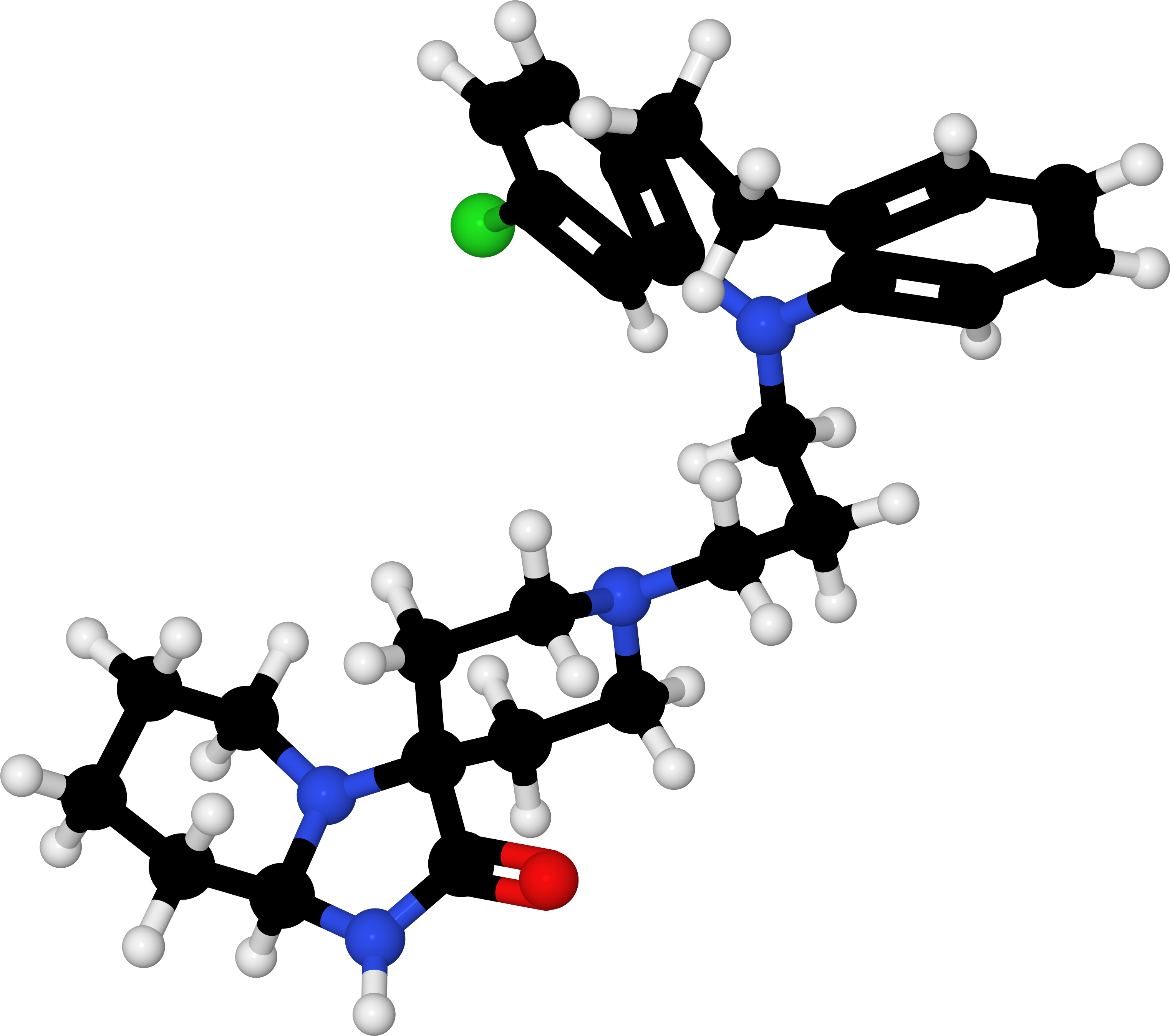

Clinical data
- Trade names: Cremin (クレミン, JP)
- AHFS/Drugs.com: International Drug Names
- Routes of administration: Oral (tablets, oral solution)
- ATC code: N05AX10 (WHO)

Legal status
- Legal status: Rx-only (JP)

Identifiers
- IUPAC name: 1'-[3-(2-chloro-5,6-dihydrobenzo[b][1]benzazepin-11-yl)propyl]spiro[1,5,6,7,8,8a-hexahydroimidazo[1,2-a]pyridine-3,4'-piperidine]-2-one
- CAS Number: 89419-40-9
- PubChem CID: 4257
- DrugBank: DB13676
- ChemSpider: 4107
- UNII: 04UZQ7O9SJ
- KEGG: D08235
- CompTox Dashboard (EPA): DTXSID0048846

Chemical and physical data
- Formula: C_{28}H_{35}ClN_{4}O
- Molar mass: 479.07 g·mol^{−1}
- 3D model (JSmol): Interactive image
- SMILES: C1CCN2C(C1)NC(=O)C23CCN(CC3)CCCN4C5=CC=CC=C5CCC6=C4C=C(C=C6)Cl
- InChI: InChI=1S/C28H35ClN4O/c29-23-12-11-22-10-9-21-6-1-2-7-24(21)32(25(22)20-23)16-5-15-31-18-13-28(14-19-31)27(34)30-26-8-3-4-17-33(26)28/h1-2,6-7,11-12,20,26H,3-5,8-10,13-19H2,(H,30,34); Key:PXUIZULXJVRBPC-UHFFFAOYSA-N

Mosapramine (Cremin) is an atypical antipsychotic of the iminodibenzyl class primarily used in Japan for the treatment of schizophrenia. It is a potent dopamine antagonist with high affinity to the D_{2}, D_{3}, and D_{4} receptors, and with moderate affinity for the 5-HT_{2} receptors.

== See also ==
- Carpipramine
- Clocapramine
- Fluspirilene (typical antipsychotic)
- Imidazopyridine
