= Penfluridol =

Chemical compound

Clinical data
- Trade names: Semap
- AHFS/Drugs.com: International Drug Names
- ATC code: N05AG03 (WHO)

Legal status
- Legal status: BR: Class C1 (Other controlled substances)

Identifiers
- IUPAC name: 1-[4,4-Bis(4-fluorophenyl)butyl]-4-[4-chloro-3-(trifluoromethyl)phenyl]piperidin-4-ol
- CAS Number: 26864-56-2
- PubChem CID: 33630
- ChemSpider: 31017
- UNII: 25TLU22Q8H
- KEGG: D02630
- ChEMBL: ChEMBL47050
- CompTox Dashboard (EPA): DTXSID5049021
- ECHA InfoCard: 100.043.689

Chemical and physical data
- Formula: C_{28}H_{27}ClF_{5}NO
- Molar mass: 523.97 g·mol^{−1}
- 3D model (JSmol): Interactive image
- SMILES: FC(F)(F)c1c(Cl)ccc(c1)C4(O)CCN(CCCC(c2ccc(F)cc2)c3ccc(F)cc3)CC4
- InChI: InChI=1S/C28H27ClF5NO/c29-26-12-7-21(18-25(26)28(32,33)34)27(36)13-16-35(17-14-27)15-1-2-24(19-3-8-22(30)9-4-19)20-5-10-23(31)11-6-20/h3-12,18,24,36H,1-2,13-17H2; Key:MDLAAYDRRZXJIF-UHFFFAOYSA-N

Penfluridol (Semap, Micefal, Longoperidol) is a highly potent, first generation diphenylbutylpiperidine antipsychotic. It was discovered at Janssen Pharmaceutica in 1968. Related to other diphenylbutylpiperidine antipsychotics, pimozide and fluspirilene, penfluridol has an extremely long elimination half-life and its effects last for many days after single oral dose. Its antipsychotic potency, in terms of dose needed to produce comparable effects, is similar to both haloperidol and pimozide. It is only slightly sedative, but often causes extrapyramidal side-effects, such as akathisia, dyskinesiae and pseudo-Parkinsonism. Penfluridol is indicated for antipsychotic treatment of chronic schizophrenia and similar psychotic disorders, it is, however, like most typical antipsychotics, being increasingly replaced by the atypical antipsychotics. Due to its extremely long-lasting effects, it is often prescribed to be taken orally as tablets only once a week (q 7 days). The once-weekly dose is usually 10–60 mg. A 2006 systematic review examined the use of penfluridol for people with schizophrenia:

Penfluridol compared to typical antipsychotics (oral) for schizophrenia
Summary
Although there are shortcomings and gaps in the data, there appears to be enough overall consistency for different outcomes. The effectiveness and adverse effects profile of penfluridol are similar to other typical antipsychotics; both oral and depot. Furthermore, penfluridol is shown to be an adequate treatment option for people with schizophrenia, especially those who do not respond to oral medication on a daily basis and do not adapt well to depot drugs. One of the results favouring penfluridol was a lower drop out rate in medium term when compared to depot medications. It is also an option for people with long-term schizophrenia with residual psychotic symptoms who nevertheless need continuous use of antipsychotic medication. An additional benefit of penfluridol is that it is a low-cost intervention.

Outcome	Findings in words	Findings in numbers	Quality of evidence
Global state
No marked improvement (CGI); Follow-up: 3 to 12 months	Penfluridol does not clearly change the chance of experiencing 'no marked improvement' when compared with receiving typical antipsychotic drugs. These findings are based on data of low quality.	RR 0.92 (0.68 to 1.24)	Low
Global state - needing additional antipsychotic Follow-up: less than 3 months	There is no clear difference between people given penfluridol and those receiving typical antipsychotics. These findings are based on data of low quality.	RR 1.35 (0.90 to 2.01)	Low
Mental state
Average score (BPRS); Follow-up: 3 to 12 months	On average, people receiving penfluridol scored higher than people treated with typical antipsychotics (oral) but there was no clear difference between the groups and this finding is based on data of low quality. The meaning of this in day-to-day care is unclear.	MD 1.24 higher (4.4 lower to 6.88 higher)	Low
Adverse events
Needing antiparkinsonism medication Follow-up: less than 3 months	There is no clear difference between people given penfluridol and those receiving typical antipsychotics (oral). These findings are based on data of low quality.	RR 1.09 (0.61 to 1.97)	Low
Insomnia; Follow-up: less than 3 months	There is no clear difference between people given penfluridol and those receiving typical antipsychotics (oral). These findings are based on data of low quality.	RR 1.07 (0.51 to 2.24)	Low
	No study reported any data on outcomes such as quality of life and information relating to time in services		

== See also ==
- Typical antipsychotic
- Diphenylbutylpiperidine
- Fluspirilene
- Pimozide
- Carpipramine (atypical antipsychotic)
- Clocapramine (atypical antipsychotic)
- Fluperamide has the same amine [21928-50-7].
- Clofluperol
