= Corymine =

Chemical compound, neurotoxin

Names
- IUPAC name Methyl (15E)-15-ethylidene-18-hydroxy-3-methyl-19-oxa-3,13-diazahexacyclo[14.3.1.0^{2,10}.0^{2,13}.0^{4,9}.0^{10,17}]icosa-4,6,8-triene-17-carboxylate
- Other names: NSC381080; Corymin

Identifiers
CAS Number	6472-42-0
3D model (JSmol)	Interactive image
ChEMBL	ChEMBL1997828
ChemSpider	4528148
PubChem CID	5379626
- InChI: Key: KRTMWLRPHKYUJX-PQMHYQBVSA-N; InChI=1S/C22H26N2O4/c1-4-13-12-24-10-9-20-14-7-5-6-8-16(14)23(2)22(20,24)17-11-15(13)21(20,18(25)27-3)19(26)28-17/h4-8,15,17,19,26H,9-12H2,1-3H3/b13-4-
- SMILES: CC=C1CN2CCC34C2(C5CC1C3(C(O5)O)C(=O)OC)N(C6=CC=CC=C46)C

Properties
Chemical formula	C_{22}H_{26}N_{2}O_{4}
Molar mass	382.460 g·mol^{−1}
- Except where otherwise noted, data are given for materials in their standard state (at 25 °C [77 °F], 100 kPa). Infobox references

Corymine, also known as NSC381080, is a natural alkaloid found in Hunteria zeylanica.

This compound acts as a glycine antagonist and could therefore, be classed as a neurotoxin.

== Occurrence ==
Corymine and many other indole alkaloids can be isolated from parts of the Hunteria zeylanica plant.

The plant also contains other similar alkaloids, such as

- 3-epi-dihydrocorymine
- 3-epi-dihydrocorymine 3-acetate
- 3-epi-dihydrocorymine 17-acetate
- norisocorymine

== Toxicity ==
Corymine and related alkaloids can act as convulsants.

Tests on Xenopus occyte species have shown that corymine can decrease glycine's action at the inhibitory glycine receptors. These same tests have revealed that Corymine can reduce the response of receptors to GABA, the primary inhibitory neurotransmitter.

Other experiments have shown that corymine can potentiate convulsions induced by strychnine, a potent glycine antagonist. This was also observed in mice.
