= Medifoxamine =

Withdrawn atypical antidepressant drug

Clinical data
- Trade names: Clédial, Gerdaxyl
- Other names: Medifoxamine fumarate; N,N-Dimethyl-2,2-diphenoxyethylamine
- Routes of administration: By mouth
- ATC code: N06AX13 (WHO)

Legal status
- Legal status: In general: ℞ (Prescription only)

Pharmacokinetic data
- Bioavailability: 21%
- Elimination half-life: 2.8 hours (acute); 4.0 hours (chronic)

Identifiers
- IUPAC name: N,N-dimethyl-2,2-diphenoxyethanamine
- CAS Number: 32359-34-5 16604-45-8 (fumarate) 16604-44-7 (picrate)
- PubChem CID: 36109
- ChemSpider: 33212
- UNII: KWU7C2A1NT
- KEGG: D07341
- CompTox Dashboard (EPA): DTXSID80186078
- ECHA InfoCard: 100.046.359

Chemical and physical data
- Formula: C_{16}H_{19}NO_{2}
- Molar mass: 257.333 g·mol^{−1}
- 3D model (JSmol): Interactive image
- Chirality: Racemic mixture
- SMILES: CN(C)CC(OC1=CC=CC=C1)OC2=CC=CC=C2
- InChI: InChI=1S/C16H19NO2/c1-17(2)13-16(18-14-9-5-3-6-10-14)19-15-11-7-4-8-12-15/h3-12,16H,13H2,1-2H3; Key:QNMGHBMGNRQPNL-UHFFFAOYSA-N

Medifoxamine, previously sold under the brand names Clédial and Gerdaxyl, is an atypical antidepressant with additional anxiolytic properties acting via dopaminergic and serotonergic mechanisms which was formerly marketed in France and Spain, as well as Morocco. The drug was first introduced in France sometime around 1990. It was withdrawn from the market in 1999 (Morocco) and 2000 (France) following incidences of hepatotoxicity.

== Pharmacology ==
=== Pharmacodynamics ===
Medifoxamine has been found to act preferentially as a relatively weak dopamine reuptake inhibitor, but also as an even weaker serotonin reuptake inhibitor (IC_{50} = 1,500 nM) and as a weak antagonist of the 5-HT_{2A} and 5-HT_{2C} receptors (IC_{50} = 950 nM and 980 nM, respectively; notably weaker affinity relative to amitriptyline and imipramine). It is known to produce two active metabolites during first-pass metabolism in the liver, CRE-10086 (N-methyl-2,2-diphenoxyethylamine) and CRE-10357 (N,N-dimethyl-2-hydroxyphenoxy-2-phenoxyethylamine). The IC_{50} values of CRE-10086 for serotonin transporter, 5-HT_{2A}, and 5-HT_{2C} binding are 450 nM, 330 nM, and 700 nM, respectively, while those of CRE-10357 are 660 nM, 1,600 nM, and 6,300 M. Medifoxamine and its metabolites lack affinity for other serotonin receptors including 5-HT_{1A}, 5-HT_{1B}, 5-HT_{1D}, and 5-HT_{3} (>10,000 nM). As medifoxamine is metabolized extensively in the liver during first-pass metabolism, and as these metabolites have as much as 3-fold greater activity relative to medifoxamine, it is likely that they contribute significantly to the pharmacology of the parent drug.

==== Effectiveness and tolerability ====
Unlike many tricyclic antidepressants, medifoxamine lacks anticholinergic and alpha blocker properties (very low affinity for the muscarinic acetylcholine receptors and 10-fold lower affinity for the α_{1}-adrenergic receptor relative to 5-HT_{2} binding sites), and is also apparently inactive as a norepinephrine reuptake inhibitor (although the same source stating this also states that it is inactive as a serotonin reuptake inhibitor, which was subsequently found not to be the case). Studies in mice revealed that the drug does not possess any sedative or locomotor stimulant effects. In accordance with all of the preceding, medifoxamine was found to be well tolerated at dosages of 100–300 mg per day in clinical trials. Double-blind controlled clinical studies have found it to have similar effectiveness to imipramine, clomipramine, and maprotiline in the treatment of depression.

== Society and culture ==
=== Generic names ===
Medifoxamine is the generic name of the drug and its INN while médifoxamine is its DCF.

=== Brand names ===
Medifoxamine was marketed under the brand names Clédial and Gerdaxyl.
