= DBL-583 =

Selective dopamine reuptake inhibitor of the piperazine chemical class

Identifiers
- CAS Number: 184713-57-3
- PubChem CID: 9960697
- ChemSpider: 8136304
- ChEMBL: ChEMBL341692
- CompTox Dashboard (EPA): DTXSID501028484

Chemical and physical data
- Formula: C_{38}H_{50}F_{2}N_{2}O_{3}
- Molar mass: 620.826 g·mol^{−1}
- 3D model (JSmol): Interactive image
- SMILES: CCCCCCCCCC(=O)OC(CCN1CCN(CC1)CCOC(C2=CC=C(C=C2)F)C3=CC=C(C=C3)F)C4=CC=CC=C4
- InChI: InChI=1S/C38H50F2N2O3/c1-2-3-4-5-6-7-11-14-37(43)45-36(31-12-9-8-10-13-31)23-24-41-25-27-42(28-26-41)29-30-44-38(32-15-19-34(39)20-16-32)33-17-21-35(40)22-18-33/h8-10,12-13,15-22,36,38H,2-7,11,14,23-30H2,1H3; Key:IXQPQADYPIEKQC-UHFFFAOYSA-N

DBL-583 is a selective dopamine reuptake inhibitor of the piperazine chemical class. It is the decanoate ester of a hydroxy vanoxerine. DBL-583 breaks down very slowly in the body, lasting for up to a month after a single injection.

== See also ==
- GBR-12783
- GBR-12935
- GBR-13069
- GBR-13098
