= Hunteria ghanensis =

Conservation status
- Endangered (IUCN 2.3)

Scientific classification
- Kingdom: Plantae
- Clade: Tracheophytes
- Clade: Angiosperms
- Clade: Eudicots
- Clade: Asterids
- Order: Gentianales
- Family: Apocynaceae
- Genus: Hunteria
- Species: H. ghanensis

Binomial name
- Hunteria ghanensis J. Hall & Leeuwenb.

Species of plant

Hunteria ghanensis is a species of small to medium tree of the family Apocynaceae. It is native to Ghana and Ivory Coast. It grows inland in the dry forests of the Guinean forest-savanna mosaic. It is threatened by habitat loss.
