= Hunteria =

Scientific classification
- Kingdom: Plantae
- Clade: Tracheophytes
- Clade: Angiosperms
- Clade: Eudicots
- Clade: Asterids
- Order: Gentianales
- Family: Apocynaceae
- Subfamily: Rauvolfioideae
- Tribe: Hunterieae
- Genus: Hunteria; Roxb.

Synonyms
- Comularia Pichon; Pleuranthemum (Pichon) Pichon; Polyadoa Stapf in D.Oliver & auct. suc. (eds.); Tetradoa Pichon

Genus of plants

Hunteria is a genus of plants in the family Apocynaceae first described as a genus in 1824. It is native to Africa and to South and Southeast Asia.

Species

1. Hunteria ballayi Hua - Central African Republic, Republic of Congo, Cameroon, Gabon
2. Hunteria camerunensis K.Schum. ex Hallier f. - Republic of Congo, Cameroon, Gabon
3. Hunteria congolana Pichon - Republic of Congo, Zaïre, Kenya
4. Hunteria densiflora Pichon - Zaïre
5. Hunteria ghanensis J.B.Hall & Leeuwenb. - Ivory Coast, Ghana
6. Hunteria hexaloba (Pichon) Omino - Gabon
7. Hunteria macrosiphon Omino - Republic of Congo, Gabon
8. Hunteria myriantha Omino - Zaïre
9. Hunteria oxyantha Omino - Republic of Congo, Zaïre, Gabon
10. Hunteria simii (Stapf) H.Huber - Guinea, Ivory Coast, Liberia, Sierra Leone
11. Hunteria umbellata (K.Schum) Hallier f. - W + C Africa from Senegal to Zaïre
12. Hunteria zeylanica (Retz.) Gardner ex Thwaites - Somalia, Kenya, Tanzania, Mozambique, S China, India, Sri Lanka, Andaman & Nicobar Islands, Indochina, W Malaysia, Sumatra
