= Altropane =

Stimulant drug

Clinical data
- ATC code: none

Identifiers
- IUPAC name: Methyl (1R,2S,3S,5S)-3-(4-fluorophenyl)-8-[(E)-3-iodoprop-2-enyl]-8-azabicyclo[3.2.1]octane-2-carboxylate
- CAS Number: 180468-34-2
- PubChem CID: 6440180
- ChemSpider: 4944487
- UNII: 1Q4092099O
- CompTox Dashboard (EPA): DTXSID901027571

Chemical and physical data
- Formula: C_{18}H_{21}FINO_{2}
- Molar mass: 429.274 g·mol^{−1}
- 3D model (JSmol): Interactive image
- SMILES: COC(=O)[C@@H]1[C@H]2CC[C@H](N2C\C=C\I)C[C@@H]1C3=CC=C(C=C3)F
- InChI: InChI=1S/C18H21FINO2/c1-23-18(22)17-15(12-3-5-13(19)6-4-12)11-14-7-8-16(17)21(14)10-2-9-20/h2-6,9,14-17H,7-8,10-11H2,1H3/b9-2+/t14-,15+,16+,17-/m0/s1; Key:GTQLIPQFXVKRKJ-UNSMHXHVSA-N

Altropane (O-587, IACFT, 2β-carbomethoxy-3β-(4-fluorophenyl)-N-((E)-3-iodo-prop-2-enyl)tropane) is a phenyltropane derivative which acts as a potent dopamine reuptake inhibitor and long-acting stimulant drug. It has mainly been used as the ^{125}I radiolabelled form for mapping the distribution of dopamine transporters in the brain, and consequently this has led to its development as a potential diagnostic tool for early detection of Parkinson's disease. It is also being investigated for potential use in the diagnosis and treatment of attention deficit hyperactivity disorder (ADHD).
