= Hunteria congolana =

Scientific classification
- Kingdom: Plantae
- Clade: Tracheophytes
- Clade: Angiosperms
- Clade: Eudicots
- Clade: Asterids
- Order: Gentianales
- Family: Apocynaceae
- Genus: Hunteria
- Species: H. congolana

Binomial name
- Hunteria congolana Pichon

Species of plant

Hunteria congolana grows as either a shrub or a tree up to 20 metres (66 ft) tall, with a trunk diameter of up to 30 centimetres (12 in). Its flowers feature a white or yellow corolla, turning pink when in bud. Fruit is yellow to bright orange. Habitat is primary forest from 500 metres (1,600 ft) to 1,700 metres (5,600 ft) altitude. Local medicinal uses include for fever, diarrhoea and as an anthelmintic. H. congolana has been used as arrow poison. The plant is native to Democratic Republic of Congo and Kenya.
