= Fluperamide =

Opioid with dual use

Identifiers
- IUPAC name: 4-[4-[4-chloro-3-(trifluoromethyl)phenyl]-4-hydroxypiperidin-1-yl]-N,N-dimethyl-2,2-diphenylbutanamide
- CAS Number: 53179-10-5
- PubChem CID: 131534
- ChemSpider: 116243
- UNII: 6H13T09362
- ChEMBL: ChEMBL421665
- CompTox Dashboard (EPA): DTXSID00866305

Chemical and physical data
- Formula: C_{30}H_{32}ClF_{3}N_{2}O_{2}
- Molar mass: 545.04 g·mol^{−1}
- 3D model (JSmol): Interactive image
- SMILES: CN(C)C(=O)C(CCN1CCC(CC1)(C2=CC(=C(C=C2)Cl)C(F)(F)F)O)(C3=CC=CC=C3)C4=CC=CC=C4
- InChI: InChI=1S/C30H32ClF3N2O2/c1-35(2)27(37)29(22-9-5-3-6-10-22,23-11-7-4-8-12-23)17-20-36-18-15-28(38,16-19-36)24-13-14-26(31)25(21-24)30(32,33)34/h3-14,21,38H,15-20H2,1-2H3; Key:WPYGCZCMGMVGNO-UHFFFAOYSA-N

Fluperamide is a synthetic opioid structurally related to loperamide, developed as a potent antidiarrheal agent. Like loperamide, it acts primarily as a peripherally selective μ-opioid receptor agonist, effectively reducing gastrointestinal motility and fluid secretion without significant central nervous system effects due to limited blood-brain barrier penetration.

Fluperamide’s pharmacological profile was designed to maximize antidiarrheal efficacy while minimizing the risk of opioid-related side effects and abuse potential, a strategy that has contributed to the development of related compounds in the phenylpiperidine class. Although fluperamide demonstrated strong antidiarrheal activity in preclinical and early clinical studies, it was ultimately not commercialized, with loperamide becoming the preferred agent in this therapeutic category due to its favorable safety and efficacy.

== See also ==
- Penfluridol
- Clofluperol
- Loperamide
