= Pericine =

Names
- IUPAC name (1R,16E)-16-Ethylidene-2-methylene-4,14-diazatetracyclo[12.2.2.0^{3,11}.0^{5,10}]octadeca-3(11),5,7,9-tetraene
- Other names Subincanadine E

Identifiers
CAS Number	84638-28-8
3D model (JSmol)	Interactive image
ChemSpider	4944986
PubChem CID	6440735
UNII	56UJL0958V
CompTox Dashboard (EPA)	DTXSID101018405
- InChI: InChI=1S/C19H22N2/c1-3-14-12-21-10-8-15(14)13(2)19-17(9-11-21)16-6-4-5-7-18(16)20-19/h3-7,15,20H,2,8-12H2,1H3/b14-3-/t15-/m0/s1 Key: VAUGOKMDSLQYNG-WNDJQJCJSA-N
- SMILES: C/C=C\1/CN2CCc3c4ccccc4[nH]c3C(=C)[C@@H]1CC2

Properties
Chemical formula	C_{19}H_{22}N_{2}
Molar mass	278.399 g·mol^{−1}
- Except where otherwise noted, data are given for materials in their standard state (at 25 °C [77 °F], 100 kPa). verify (what is ?) Infobox references

Pericine is one of a number of indole alkaloids found in the tree Picralima nitida, commonly known as akuamma. As with some other alkaloids from this plant such as akuammine, pericine has been shown to bind to mu opioid receptors in vitro, and has an IC_{50} of 0.6 μmol, within the range of a weak analgesic. It may also have convulsant effects.

Pericine has been prepared in the laboratory by total synthesis.

== See also ==
- Vobasine
- Isovoacristine
