= Clocapramine =

Antipsychotic medication

Clinical data
- Trade names: Clofekton, Padrasen
- AHFS/Drugs.com: International Drug Names
- Routes of administration: Oral
- ATC code: None

Legal status
- Legal status: In general: ℞ (Prescription only)

Identifiers
- IUPAC name: 1-[3-(2-chloro-5,6-dihydrobenzo[b][1]benzazepin-11-yl)propyl]-4-piperidin-1-ylpiperidine-4-carboxamide
- CAS Number: 47739-98-0
- PubChem CID: 2793
- DrugBank: DB09003
- ChemSpider: 2691
- UNII: 6EEL1GB72K
- KEGG: D07718
- ChEMBL: ChEMBL2104103
- CompTox Dashboard (EPA): DTXSID1057749

Chemical and physical data
- Formula: C_{28}H_{37}ClN_{4}O
- Molar mass: 481.08 g·mol^{−1}
- 3D model (JSmol): Interactive image
- SMILES: Clc1ccc3c(c1)N(c2ccccc2CC3)CCCN5CCC(C(=O)N)(N4CCCCC4)CC5

Clocapramine (Clofekton, Padrasen), also known as 3-chlorocarpipramine, is an atypical antipsychotic of the iminostilbene class which was introduced in Japan in 1974 by Yoshitomi for the treatment of schizophrenia. In addition to psychosis, clocapramine has also been used to augment antidepressants in the treatment of anxiety and panic.

Clocapramine has been reported to act as an antagonist of the D_{2}, 5-HT_{2A}, α_{1}-adrenergic, and α_{2}-adrenergic receptors, and does not inhibit the reuptake of either serotonin or norepinephrine. It has also been shown to have affinity for SIGMAR1. Clocapramine's affinity for the 5-HT_{2A} receptor is greater than that for the D_{2} receptor and it has a lower propensity for inducing extrapyramidal symptoms compared to typical antipsychotics, thus underlying its atypical nature.

== Clinical trials ==
In several clinical trials, clocapramine has been compared to other neuroleptic agents. Against haloperidol, though there was no significant difference in efficacy at the end of the study, clocapramine tended to be superior in alleviating motor retardation, alogia, and thought disorder, and also produced fewer side effects. Against sulpiride, clocapramine demonstrated more favorable effects in the treatment of both positive and negative symptoms, including motor retardation, delusions, hallucinations, and social isolation, though it produced more side effects. Against timiperone, clocapramine showed lower efficacy against both positive and negative symptoms and produced more side effects such as dyskinesia, insomnia, constipation, and nausea.

Clocapramine has been implicated in at least one fatality, a suicide in which there were two self-inflicted stab wounds and an overdose of clocapramine as well as three other antipsychotics was taken. The stab wounds could not explain the death, and thus, it was attributed to multiple drug toxicity instead.

== See also ==
- Carpipramine
- Mosapramine
- Penfluridol (typical antipsychotic)
