= Pimozide =

Chemical compound

- Molecular structure of pimozide

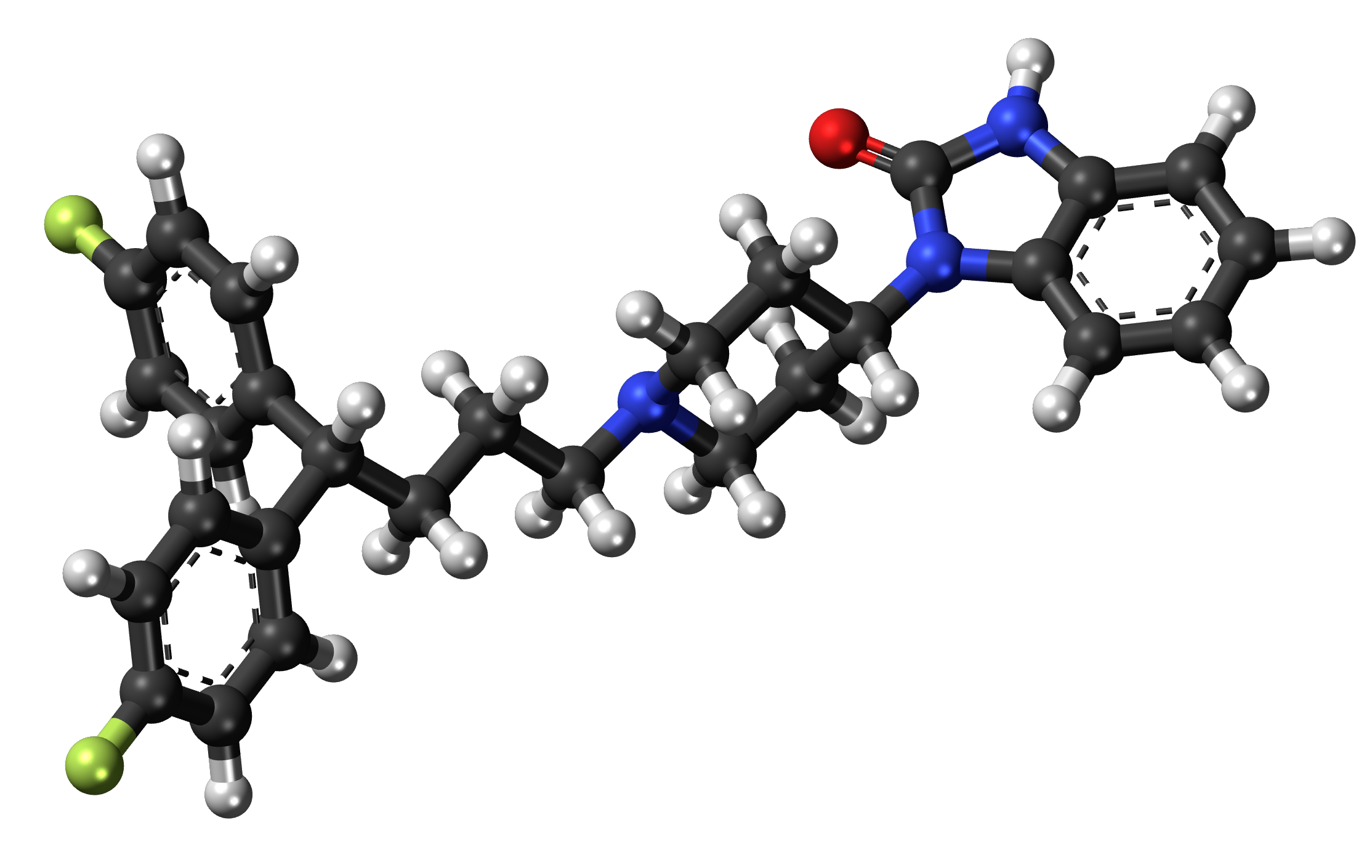
- 3D representation of a pimozide molecule

Clinical data
- Trade names: Orap
- AHFS/Drugs.com: Monograph
- MedlinePlus: a686018
- License data: US FDA: Pimozide
- Pregnancy category: AU: B1
- Routes of administration: Oral
- Drug class: Typical antipsychotic
- ATC code: N05AG02 (WHO)

Legal status
- Legal status: AU: S4 (Prescription only); BR: Class C1 (Other controlled substances); US: ℞-only

Pharmacokinetic data
- Bioavailability: 40–50%
- Metabolism: CYP3A4, CYP1A2 and CYP2D6
- Elimination half-life: 55 hours (adults), 66 hours (children)
- Excretion: Urine

Identifiers
- IUPAC name: 1-[1-[4,4-Bis(4-fluorophenyl)butyl]-4-piperidinyl]-1,3-dihydro-2H-benzimidazole-2-one
- CAS Number: 2062-78-4
- PubChem CID: 16362
- IUPHAR/BPS: 90
- DrugBank: DB01100
- ChemSpider: 15520
- UNII: 1HIZ4DL86F
- KEGG: D00560
- ChEBI: CHEBI:8212
- ChEMBL: ChEMBL1423
- CompTox Dashboard (EPA): DTXSID8023474
- ECHA InfoCard: 100.016.520

Chemical and physical data
- Formula: C_{28}H_{29}F_{2}N_{3}O
- Molar mass: 461.557 g·mol^{−1}
- 3D model (JSmol): Interactive image
- SMILES: Fc1ccc(cc1)C(c2ccc(F)cc2)CCCN5CCC(N4c3ccccc3NC4=O)CC5
- InChI: InChI=1S/C28H29F2N3O/c29-22-11-7-20(8-12-22)25(21-9-13-23(30)14-10-21)4-3-17-32-18-15-24(16-19-32)33-27-6-2-1-5-26(27)31-28(33)34/h1-2,5-14,24-25H,3-4,15-19H2,(H,31,34); Key:YVUQSNJEYSNKRX-UHFFFAOYSA-N

Pimozide, sold under the brand name Orap, is a typical antipsychotic medication of the diphenylbutylpiperidine class. It was discovered at Janssen Pharmaceutica in 1963. It is indicated for use in Tourette syndrome and resistant tics. It has a high potency compared to chlorpromazine (ratio 50–70:1). On a weight basis it is even more potent than haloperidol.

== Medical uses ==
Pimozide is used for Tourette syndrome, and resistant tics (Europe, United States, and Canada) and in Europe for schizophrenia, chronic psychosis, delusional disorder, and paranoid personality disorder.

== Efficacy ==
A 2013 systematic review compared pimozide with other antipsychotics for schizophrenia or related psychoses: Pimozide versus any other antipsychotic

In one case a series of 33 patients with delusional parasitosis (median age, 60 years), pimozide was prescribed for 24 patients, 18 of whom took the drug. The dose ranged from 1 to 5 mg daily. No information regarding initial dosing was specified, although the dose was continued for 6 weeks prior to tapering. Of those patients receiving pimozide, 61% (11/18) experienced improvement in or full remission of symptoms. The use of pimozide for the treatment of delusional parasitosis is based primarily on data from case series/reports that demonstrate some efficacy in the majority of patients. Currently, atypical antipsychotics such as olanzapine or risperidone are used as first-line treatment. However, patients who experience negative side effects with the first line medications are typically given pimozide.

== Contraindications ==
It is contraindicated in individuals with either acquired, congenital or a family history of QT interval prolongation. Its use is advised against in individuals with people with either a personal or a family history of arrhythmias or torsades de pointes. Likewise its use is also advised against in individuals with uncorrected hypokalaemia and hypomagnesaemia or clinical significant cardiac disorders (e.g. a recent myocardial infarction or bradycardia. It is also contraindicated in individuals being cotreated with selective serotonin reuptake inhibitors (SSRI) or in those with a known hypersensitivity to pimozide or other diphenylbutyl-piperidine derivatives. Likewise its use is contraindicated in individuals receiving treatment with CYP3A4, CYP1A2, or CYP2D6 inhibitors.

== Side effects ==
Very common (>10% frequency) side effects include:

- Akinesia
- Constipation
- Dizziness
- Dry mouth
- Hyperhidrosis
- Nocturia
- Somnolence
- Speech disorder

== Overdose ==
Pimozide overdose presents with severe extrapyramidal symptoms, hypotension, sedation, QT interval prolongation and ventricular arrhythmias including torsades de pointes. Gastric lavage, establishment of a patent airway and, if necessary, mechanically assisted respiration is the recommended treatment for pimozide overdose. Cardiac monitoring should be continued for at least 4 days due to the long half-life of pimozide.

== Pharmacology ==
Pimozide acts as an antagonist of the D_{2}, D_{3}, and D_{4} receptors and the 5-HT_{7} receptor. It is also a hERG blocker.

Similarly to other typical antipsychotics pimozide has a high affinity for the dopamine D_{2} receptor and this likely results in its sexual (due to prolactin hypersecretion) and extrapyramidal side effects as well as its therapeutic efficacy against the positive symptoms of schizophrenia.

Binding profile (Note: A lower K_{i} value indicates a stronger binding)
Protein	K_{i} (nM)	Notes
5-HT_{1A}	650	
5-HT_{2A}	48.4	This receptor is believed to be responsible for the atypicality of other antipsychotics like clozapine, olanzapine and quetiapine. Pimozide's affinity towards this receptor is low compared to its affinity for the D_{2} receptor and hence this receptor unlikely contributes to its effects to any meaningful extent.
5-HT_{2C}	2,112	
5-HT_{6}	71	
5-HT_{7}	0.5	Relatively high affinity for this receptor may explain its supposed antidepressant-like effects in animal models of depression.
α_{1A}	197.7	Low affinity towards this receptor may explain why pimozide has a lower liability for producing orthostatic hypotension.
α_{2A}	1,593	
α_{2B}	821	
α_{2C}	376.5	
M_{3}	1,955	This receptor is believed to be responsible for the interference with glucose homeostasis seen with some of the atypical antipsychotics such as clozapine and olanzapine. Pimozide's low affinity for this receptor likely contributes to the comparatively mild effects on glucose homeostasis.
D_{1}	>10,000	
D_{2}	0.33	Likely the receptor responsible for the therapeutic effects against the positive symptoms of schizophrenia of antipsychotics like pimozide as well as the prolactin-elevating and extrapyramidal side effect-generating effects of typical antipsychotics like pimozide.
D_{3}	0.25	
D_{4}	1.8	
hERG	18	May be responsible for pimozide's high liability for prolonging the QT interval.
H_{1}	692	Likely responsible for why pimozide tends to produce so little sedation.
σ	508	

Pharmacokinetic data
Pharmacokinetic parameter	Value
Time to peak plasma concentration (T_{max})	6–8 hours
Peak plasma concentration (C_{max})	4–19 ng/mL
Elimination half-life (t_{1/2})	55 hours (adults), 66 hours (children)
Metabolising enzymes	CYP3A4, CYP1A2 and CYP2D6
Excretion pathways	Urine

== History ==
In 1985, pimozide was approved by the US Food and Drug Administration for marketing as an orphan drug for the treatment of Tourette syndrome.

== See also ==
- Amisulpride
- Pipamperone
- Fluspirilene
- Penfluridol
