= Clofluperol =

Long acting antipsychotic butyrophenone

Clinical data
- Other names: Seperidol, R9298

Identifiers
- IUPAC name: 4-[4-[4-chloro-3-(trifluoromethyl)phenyl]-4-hydroxypiperidin-1-yl]-1-(4-fluorophenyl)butan-1-one
- CAS Number: 10457-91-7
- PubChem CID: 25293
- ChemSpider: 23626
- UNII: N57F04DIDQ
- ChEMBL: ChEMBL2111071
- CompTox Dashboard (EPA): DTXSID90146562

Chemical and physical data
- Formula: C_{22}H_{22}ClF_{4}NO_{2}
- Molar mass: 443.87 g·mol^{−1}
- 3D model (JSmol): Interactive image
- SMILES: C1CN(CCC1(C2=CC(=C(C=C2)Cl)C(F)(F)F)O)CCCC(=O)C3=CC=C(C=C3)F
- InChI: InChI=1S/C22H22ClF4NO2/c23-19-8-5-16(14-18(19)22(25,26)27)21(30)9-12-28(13-10-21)11-1-2-20(29)15-3-6-17(24)7-4-15/h3-8,14,30H,1-2,9-13H2; Key:LZFSKNPPWIFMFL-UHFFFAOYSA-N

Clofluperol is a neuroleptic tranquilizer of the butyrophenone class. It has the same aromatic piperidinol moiety that is present in penfluridol and fluperamide. The structure can be seen to be a sort of hybrid between that of trifluperidol and haloperidol.
