= Hunteria umbellata =

Conservation status
- Least Concern (IUCN 3.1)

Scientific classification
- Kingdom: Plantae
- Clade: Embryophytes
- Clade: Tracheophytes
- Clade: Spermatophytes
- Clade: Angiosperms
- Clade: Eudicots
- Clade: Asterids
- Order: Gentianales
- Family: Apocynaceae
- Genus: Hunteria
- Species: H. umbellata

Binomial name
- Hunteria umbellata (K.Schum) Hallier f.

Synonyms
- Carpodinus umbellata K.Schum; Hunteria eburnea Pichon; Hunteria elliotii (Stapf) Pichon; Hunteria mayumbensis Pichon; Picralima elliotii (Stapf) Stapf; Picralima umbellata (K.Schum.) Stapf; Polyadoa elliotii Stapf; Polyadoa umbellata (K.Schum.) Stapf

Species of plant

Hunteria umbellata grows as either a shrub or small tree up to 22 metres (72 ft) tall, with a trunk diameter of up to 40 centimetres (16 in). Its flowers feature a white, creamy or pale yellow corolla. The fruit is yellow and smooth. Its habitat is forests from sea level to 600 metres (2,000 ft) altitude. Its numerous local medicinal uses include for fever, leprosy sores, stomach and liver problems and as an anthelmintic, especially against internal worms. Hunteria umbellata has been used as arrow poison. The plant's hard wood is used in carving and to make small tools. The species is native to an area of tropical Africa from Guinea-Bissau in the west to Angola in the south.
