= 4-Hydroxy-1-methyl-4-(4-methylphenyl)-3-piperidyl 4-methylphenyl ketone =

Names
- Preferred IUPAC name [(3R,4S)-4-Hydroxy-1-methyl-4-(4-methylphenyl)piperidin-3-yl](4-methylphenyl)methanone

Identifiers
CAS Number	224948-87-2
3D model (JSmol)	Interactive image
ChemSpider	8080932
PubChem CID	9905279
UNII	JYH5V2N2LA
CompTox Dashboard (EPA)	DTXSID001336012
- InChI: InChI=1S/C21H25NO2/c1-15-4-8-17(9-5-15)20(23)19-14-22(3)13-12-21(19,24)18-10-6-16(2)7-11-18/h4-11,19,24H,12-14H2,1-3H3/t19-,21+/m0/s1 Key: SWFNNRQTSSTAGB-PZJWPPBQSA-N; InChI=1/C21H25NO2/c1-15-4-8-17(9-5-15)20(23)19-14-22(3)13-12-21(19,24)18-10-6-16(2)7-11-18/h4-11,19,24H,12-14H2,1-3H3/t19-,21+/m0/s1 Key: SWFNNRQTSSTAGB-PZJWPPBQBL
- SMILES: O=C(c1ccc(cc1)C)[C@H]3[C@](O)(c2ccc(cc2)C)CCN(C)C3

Properties
Chemical formula	C_{21}H_{25}NO_{2}
Molar mass	323.436 g·mol^{−1}
Melting point	142 °C (288 °F; 415 K)
- Except where otherwise noted, data are given for materials in their standard state (at 25 °C [77 °F], 100 kPa). Infobox references

4-Hydroxy-1-methyl-4-(4-methylphenyl)-3-piperidyl 4-methylphenyl ketone is a dopamine transporter reuptake inhibitor used as a lead compound to find a DRI transporter site antagonist (i.e. a compound that fills the ligand binding site without inhibiting the flow of neurotransmitters to the degree that another ligand at its site would).

In the Journal of Medical Chemistry, researchers reported the discovery of a novel dopamine transporter (DAT) inhibitor with significant potential for treating cocaine abuse. Through 3D-database pharmacophore searching, they identified a compound with a unique pharmacological profile, distinct from cocaine, at dopamine, serotonin, and norepinephrine transporter sites. The study highlighted that "hydrophobicity and conformational preference are two additional important parameters that determine affinity at the DAT site." By chemically modifying the lead compound, the team developed a high-affinity analogue that partially mimics cocaine's effects on locomotor activity in mice but lacks its discriminative stimulus effects in rats. These findings suggest the compound could serve as a promising candidate for further evaluation as a therapy for cocaine abuse.
