= GBR-13098 =

Names
- IUPAC name 1-{2-[Bis(4-fluorophenyl)methoxy]ethyl}-4-[3-(4-fluorophenyl)propyl]piperazine;methanesulfonic acid

Identifiers
CAS Number	77862-94-3
3D model (JSmol)	Interactive image
ChEMBL	base only: ChEMBL40797
ChemSpider	117129
PubChem CID	132673
CompTox Dashboard (EPA)	DTXSID60999062
- InChI: InChI=1S/C28H31F3N2O.2CH4O3S/c29-25-9-3-22(4-10-25)2-1-15-32-16-18-33(19-17-32)20-21-34-28(23-5-11-26(30)12-6-23)24-7-13-27(31)14-8-24;2*1-5(2,3)4/h3-14,28H,1-2,15-21H2;2*1H3,(H,2,3,4) Key: HDZUAWFACXESQE-UHFFFAOYSA-N
- SMILES: CS(=O)(=O)O.CS(=O)(=O)O.C1CN(CCN1CCCC2=CC=C(C=C2)F)CCOC(C3=CC=C(C=C3)F)C4=CC=C(C=C4)F

Properties
Chemical formula	C_{30}H_{39}F_{3}N_{2}O_{7}S_{2}
Molar mass	660.76 g·mol^{−1}
- Except where otherwise noted, data are given for materials in their standard state (at 25 °C [77 °F], 100 kPa). Infobox references

GBR-13098 is a psychostimulant and selective dopamine uptake inhibitor.

Blocking the endogenous striatal dopamine (DA) transporter with GBR-13098 in mice has been shown to prevent damage to the DA nerve terminals caused by malonate. It was suggested that DA transporter inhibitors like GBR-13098 could be used to prevent or treat neurodegenerative disorders caused by the effect of mitochondrial dysfunction on DA homeostasis.

== See also ==
- Vanoxerine
- GBR-12783
- GBR-12935
- GBR-13069
- DBL-583
