= Hunteria zeylanica =

Conservation status
- Least Concern (IUCN 3.1)

Scientific classification
- Kingdom: Plantae
- Clade: Embryophytes
- Clade: Tracheophytes
- Clade: Spermatophytes
- Clade: Angiosperms
- Clade: Eudicots
- Clade: Asterids
- Order: Gentianales
- Family: Apocynaceae
- Genus: Hunteria
- Species: H. zeylanica

Binomial name
- Hunteria zeylanica (Retz.) Gardner ex Thwaites

Synonyms
- Cameraria zeylanica Retz.; Gynopogon lanceolatus Kurz; Hunteria africana K.Schum; Hunteria corymbosa Roxb.; Hunteria lanceolata Wall. ex A.DC.; Hunteria legocii Livera; Hunteria roxburghiana Wight; Tabernaemontana salicifolia Wall. ex A.DC.

Species of plant

Hunteria zeylanica grows as either an evergreen shrub or as a tree up to 15 m (50 ft) tall, with a trunk diameter of up to 34.5 cm (13.6 in). Its flowers feature a white corolla. The berries are yellow. Its habitat is forests from sea level to 350 m (1,100 ft) altitude. The trees can withstand salinity. Local medicinal uses include for stomach-ache. Hunteria zeylanica wood is used for weapon handles and as firewood. In Africa, the plant is native to Kenya and Tanzania and in Asia it is native to China, India, Sri Lanka, Indochina and western Malesia.
