= Carpipramine =

Antipsychotic medication

Clinical data
- AHFS/Drugs.com: International Drug Names
- Routes of administration: Oral
- ATC code: None

Legal status
- Legal status: In general: ℞ (Prescription only)

Identifiers
- IUPAC name: 1-[3-(5,6-dihydrobenzo[b][1]benzazepin-11-yl)propyl]-4-piperidin-1-ylpiperidine-4-carboxamide
- CAS Number: 5942-95-0
- PubChem CID: 2580
- DrugBank: DB20320
- ChemSpider: 2482
- UNII: 8AFK6F91EQ
- ChEMBL: ChEMBL2110775
- CompTox Dashboard (EPA): DTXSID40208149
- ECHA InfoCard: 100.025.182

Chemical and physical data
- Formula: C_{28}H_{38}N_{4}O
- Molar mass: 446.639 g·mol^{−1}
- 3D model (JSmol): Interactive image
- SMILES: O=C(N)C5(N1CCCCC1)CCN(CCCN4c2ccccc2CCc3ccccc34)CC5

Carpipramine (Prazinil, Defekton) is an atypical antipsychotic used for the treatment of schizophrenia and anxiety in France and Japan. In addition to its neuroleptic and anxiolytic effects, carpipramine also has hypnotic properties. It is structurally related to both tricyclics like imipramine and butyrophenones like haloperidol.

== See also ==
- Clocapramine
- Mosapramine
- Penfluridol (typical antipsychotic)
