= Eburnamenine =

Names
- IUPAC name Eburnamenine
- Systematic IUPAC name (4^{1}R,13aR)-13a-Ethyl-2,3,4^{1},5,6,13a-hexahydro-1H-indolo[3,2,1-de]pyrido[3,2,1-ij][1,5]naphthyridine

Identifiers
CAS Number	517-30-6
3D model (JSmol)	Interactive image
ChEBI	CHEBI:35644
ChemSpider	5256838
PubChem CID	6857502
UNII	LB9CWH9GJ2
CompTox Dashboard (EPA)	DTXSID201046055
- InChI: InChI=1S/C19H22N2/c1-2-19-9-5-11-20-12-8-15-14-6-3-4-7-16(14)21(13-10-19)17(15)18(19)20/h3-4,6-7,10,13,18H,2,5,8-9,11-12H2,1H3/t18-,19+/m0/s1 Key: VKTOXAGUZWAECL-RBUKOAKNSA-N
- SMILES: CC[C@]12CCCN3[C@H]1c4c(c5ccccc5n4C=C2)CC3

Properties
Chemical formula	C_{19}H_{22}N_{2}
Molar mass	278.399 g·mol^{−1}
- Except where otherwise noted, data are given for materials in their standard state (at 25 °C [77 °F], 100 kPa). Infobox references

Eburnamenine is an anticholinergic alkaloid.
