= FG5865 =

Alcoholism drug

Identifiers
- IUPAC name: 2-[4-[4,4-Bis(4-fluorophenyl)butyl]piperazin-1-yl]pyridine-3-carboxamide
- PubChem CID: 10026785
- ChemSpider: 8202356

Chemical and physical data
- Formula: C_{26}H_{28}F_{2}N_{4}O
- Molar mass: 450.534 g·mol^{−1}
- 3D model (JSmol): Interactive image
- SMILES: C1CN(CCN1CCCC(C2=CC=C(C=C2)F)C3=CC=C(C=C3)F)C4=C(C=CC=N4)C(=O)N
- InChI: InChI=1S/C26H28F2N4O/c27-21-9-5-19(6-10-21)23(20-7-11-22(28)12-8-20)4-2-14-31-15-17-32(18-16-31)26-24(25(29)33)3-1-13-30-26/h1,3,5-13,23H,2,4,14-18H2,(H2,29,33); Key:KLMRSRHIWFLPBI-UHFFFAOYSA-N

FG5865 is from the diphenylbutylpiperazine class of agents. It is a 5-HT1A agonist and a 5-HT2A antagonist.

It is believed to be an anxiolytic agent with treatment in substance abuse disorders particularly alcoholism.

There is evidence to suggest that FG5865 is a SNDRI.

== See also ==
- Amperozide
- FG-5893
