= FG-5893 =

Substance for treatment of alcoholism

Clinical data
- Other names: FG5893

Identifiers
- IUPAC name: methyl 2-[4-[4,4-bis(4-fluorophenyl)butyl]piperazin-1-yl]pyridine-3-carboxylate
- CAS Number: 150527-23-4
- PubChem CID: 127728
- IUPHAR/BPS: 13
- ChemSpider: 113304
- UNII: 2QR7EI62WQ
- CompTox Dashboard (EPA): DTXSID50164565

Chemical and physical data
- Formula: C_{27}H_{29}F_{2}N_{3}O_{3}
- Molar mass: 481.544 g·mol^{−1}
- 3D model (JSmol): Interactive image
- SMILES: COC(=O)C1=C(N=CC=C1)N2CCN(CC2)CCCC(C3=CC=C(C=C3)F)C4=CC=C(C=C4)F
- InChI: InChI=1S/C27H29F2N3O2/c1-34-27(33)25-4-2-14-30-26(25)32-18-16-31(17-19-32)15-3-5-24(20-6-10-22(28)11-7-20)21-8-12-23(29)13-9-21/h2,4,6-14,24H,3,5,15-19H2,1H3; Key:NDCPNKXUTJGQQC-UHFFFAOYSA-N

FG-5893 is a chemical from the diphenylbutylpiperazine class of agents. It is a 5-HT1A agonist and a 5-HT2A antagonist.

It is believed to be an anxiolytic agent with potential uses in the treatment of substance abuse disorders particularly alcoholism.

There is evidence for FG-5893 behaving as a SNDRI:

CNS review:

== See also ==
- Amperozide
- FG5865
