= Akuammine =

Names
- Other names Vincamajoridine

Identifiers
CAS Number	3512-87-6
3D model (JSmol)	Interactive image
ChEMBL	ChEMBL484665
ChemSpider	16735645
PubChem CID	6441511
UNII	0421AQV5W3
- InChI: InChI=1S/C22H26N2O4/c1-4-13-11-24-8-7-21-16-9-14(25)5-6-17(16)23(2)22(21)18(24)10-15(13)20(21,12-28-22)19(26)27-3/h4-6,9,15,18,25H,7-8,10-12H2,1-3H3/b13-4+/t15-,18?,20?,21+,22-/m1/s1 Key: YILKZADAWNUTTB-OCTHBTNBSA-N
- SMILES: COC(=O)C46CO[C@]35N(C)c1ccc(O)cc1[C@]56CCN2C/C(=C\C)[C@H]4CC23

Properties
Chemical formula	C_{22}H_{26}N_{2}O_{4}
Molar mass	382.460 g·mol^{−1}
Melting point	225 °C (437 °F; 498 K)
- Except where otherwise noted, data are given for materials in their standard state (at 25 °C [77 °F], 100 kPa). verify (what is ?) Infobox references

Akuammine (vincamajoridine) is an indole alkaloid. It is the most abundant alkaloid found in the seeds from the tree Picralima nitida, commonly known as akuamma, comprising 0.56% of the dried powder. It has also been isolated from Vinca major. Akuammine is structurally related to yohimbine, mitragynine and more distantly voacangine, all of which are alkaloid plant products.

== Pharmacology ==
Akuammine has antimalarial activity, and may be the primary constituent of P. nitida seeds responsible for this activity.

Akuammine is an opioid agonist with low affinity, selective for the mu-opioid receptor, when tested in vitro.
