= Amperozide =

Chemical compound

Clinical data
- ATCvet code: QN05AX90 (WHO)

Identifiers
- IUPAC name: 4-[4,4-bis(4-fluorophenyl)butyl]-N-ethylpiperazine-1-carboxamide
- CAS Number: 75558-90-6
- PubChem CID: 73333
- ChemSpider: 66062
- UNII: 0M2W3TAG39
- ChEMBL: ChEMBL1079935
- CompTox Dashboard (EPA): DTXSID6048416

Chemical and physical data
- Formula: C_{23}H_{29}F_{2}N_{3}O
- Molar mass: 401.502 g·mol^{−1}
- 3D model (JSmol): Interactive image
- SMILES: CCNC(=O)N1CCN(CC1)CCCC(C2=CC=C(C=C2)F)C3=CC=C(C=C3)F
- InChI: InChI=1S/C23H29F2N3O/c1-2-26-23(29)28-16-14-27(15-17-28)13-3-4-22(18-5-9-20(24)10-6-18)19-7-11-21(25)12-8-19/h5-12,22H,2-4,13-17H2,1H3,(H,26,29); Key:NNAIYOXJNVGUOM-UHFFFAOYSA-N

Amperozide is an atypical antipsychotic of the diphenylbutylpiperazine class which acts as an antagonist at the 5-HT_{2A} receptor. It does not block dopamine receptors as with most antipsychotic drugs, but does inhibit dopamine release, and alters the firing pattern of dopaminergic neurons. It was investigated for the treatment of schizophrenia in humans, but never adopted clinically. Its main use is instead in veterinary medicine, primarily in intensively farmed pigs, for decreasing aggression and stress and thereby increasing feeding and productivity.

== See also ==
- FG-5893
