= Dibenzazepine =

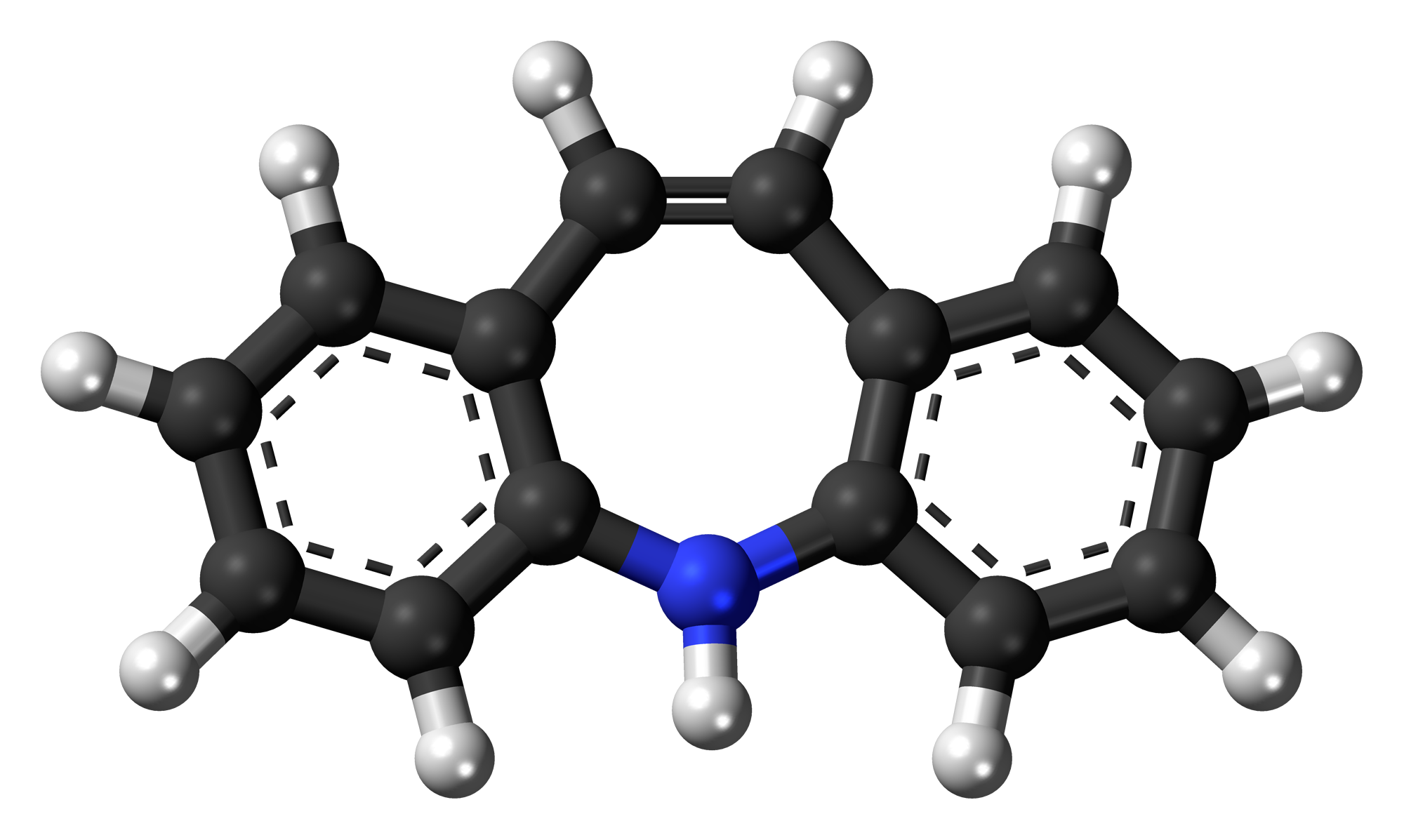

Names
- Preferred IUPAC name 5H-Dibenzo[b,f]azepine
- Other names Iminostilbene

Identifiers
CAS Number	256-96-2
3D model (JSmol)	Interactive image
ChEBI	CHEBI:47802
ChEMBL	ChEMBL243596
ChemSpider	8857
ECHA InfoCard	100.005.428
PubChem CID	9212
UNII	J411KQJ8C2
CompTox Dashboard (EPA)	DTXSID90871625
- InChI: InChI=1S/C14H11N/c1-3-7-13-11(5-1)9-10-12-6-2-4-8-14(12)15-13/h1-10,15H
- SMILES: c3cc2c(\C=C/c1c(cccc1)N2)cc3

Properties
Chemical formula	C_{14}H_{11}N
Molar mass	193.249 g·mol^{−1}
- Except where otherwise noted, data are given for materials in their standard state (at 25 °C [77 °F], 100 kPa). Infobox references

Dibenzazepine (iminostilbene) is a chemical compound with two benzene rings fused to an azepine ring. Many pharmaceuticals, such as carbamazepine, oxcarbazepine, and depramine, are based on a dibenzazepine structure.

== See also ==
- Benzazepine
- Dibenzothiazepine
- Dibenzothiepin
- Dibenzoxepin
- Iminodibenzyl
