= Dopamine reuptake inhibitor =

Class of drug

- Drug class

Class identifiers
- Use: Major depressive disorder, attention-deficit hyperactivity disorder, narcolepsy
- Biological target: Dopamine transporter

Legal status

A dopamine reuptake inhibitor (DRI) is a class of drug which acts as a reuptake inhibitor of the monoamine neurotransmitter dopamine by blocking the action of the dopamine transporter (DAT). Reuptake inhibition is achieved when extracellular dopamine not absorbed by the postsynaptic neuron is blocked from re-entering the presynaptic neuron. This results in increased extracellular concentrations of dopamine and increase in dopaminergic neurotransmission.

DRIs are used in the treatment of attention-deficit hyperactivity disorder (ADHD) and narcolepsy for their psychostimulant effects, and in the treatment of obesity and binge eating disorder for their appetite suppressant effects. They are sometimes used as antidepressants in the treatment of mood disorders, but their use as antidepressants is limited given that strong DRIs have a high abuse potential and legal restrictions on their use. Lack of dopamine reuptake and the increase in extracellular levels of dopamine have been linked to increased susceptibility to addictive behavior given increase in dopaminergic neurotransmission. The dopaminergic pathways are considered to be strong reward centers. Many DRIs such as cocaine are drugs of abuse due to the rewarding effects evoked by elevated synaptic concentrations of dopamine in the brain.

== Medical uses ==
The following drugs have DRI action and have been or are used clinically specifically for this property: amineptine, dexmethylphenidate, difemetorex, fencamfamine, lefetamine, levophacetoperane, medifoxamine, mesocarb, methylphenidate, nomifensine, pipradrol, prolintane, and pyrovalerone.

The following drugs are or have been used clinically and possess only weak DRI action, which may or may not be clinically-relevant: adrafinil, armodafinil, bupropion, mazindol, modafinil, nefazodone, sertraline, and sibutramine.

The following drugs are or have been clinically used but only coincidentally have DRI properties: benzatropine, diphenylpyraline, etybenzatropine, ketamine, nefopam, pethidine (meperidine), and tripelennamine.

The following are a selection of some particularly notably abused DRIs: cocaine, ketamine, MDPV, naphyrone, and phencyclidine (PCP). Amphetamines, including amphetamine, methamphetamine, MDMA, cathinone, methcathinone, mephedrone, and methylone, are all DRIs as well, but are distinct in that they also behave, potentially more potently, as dopamine releasing agents (DRAs) (due to Yerkes–Dodson's law, 'more potently stimulated' may not equal more optimally functionally stimulated). There are very distinct differences in the mode of action between dopamine releasers/substrates & dopamine re-uptake inhibitors; the former are functionally entropy-driven (i.e., relating to hydrophobicity) and the latter are enthalpy-driven (i.e., relating conformational change). Reuptake inhibitors such as cocaine induce hyperpolarization of cloned human DAT upon oocytes that are naturally found on neurons, whereas releasing agents induce de-polarization of the neuron membrane.

The wakefulness-promoting agent modafinil and its analogues (e.g., adrafinil, armodafinil) have been approved to treat narcolepsy and shift work sleep disorder. These act as weak (micromolar) DRIs, but this effect does not correlate with wakefulness-promoting effects, suggesting the effect is too weak to be of clinical significance. The conclusion is that these drugs promote wakefulness via some other mechanism.

DRIs have been explored as potential antiaddictive agents in the context of replacement therapy strategies, analogous to nicotine replacement for treating tobacco addiction and methadone replacement in the case of opioid addiction. DRIs have been explored as treatment for cocaine addiction, and have shown to alleviate cravings and self-administration.

Monoamine reuptake inhibitors, including DRIs, have proven quite effective in managing excessive food consumption and regulating appetite in obese patients. Though such pharmacotherapy is still available, the majority of stimulant anorectics marketed for this purpose have been withdrawn or discontinued due to adverse side effects such as hypertension, valvulopathy, and drug dependence.

== Pharmacology ==
DRIs may be divisible into two different types with different effects: (1) typical or conventional DRIs like cocaine, WIN-35428 (β-CFT), and methylphenidate that produce potent psychostimulant, euphoric, and reinforcing effects; and (2) atypical DRIs like vanoxerine (GBR-12909), modafinil, benztropine, and bupropion, which do not produce such effects or have greatly reduced such effects. Moreover, atypical DRIs are often dysphoric at high doses.

Typical DRIs may actually be acting as dopamine releasing agent (DRA)-like agents that have been referred to as dopamine transporter (DAT) "inverse agonists" rather than as simple competitive reuptake inhibitors (which is what atypical DRIs are proposed to be). Typical DRIs are similar to substrate-type DRAs in their effects on brain dopamine levels and in their subjective and behavioral effects.

In terms of maximal brain dopamine elevations, typical DRIs or DAT "inverse agonists" can increase levels by 500 to 1,500%, substrate-type DRAs by more than 1,000% (as high as 5,000% or more), and atypical DRIs or competitive reuptake inhibitors by less than or equal to 500%.

== History ==
Until the 1950s, dopamine was thought to only contribute to the biosynthesis of norepinephrine and epinephrine. It was not until dopamine was found in the brain in similar levels as norepinephrine that the possibility was considered that its biological role might be other than the synthesis of the catecholamines.

== List of DRIs ==
Only DRIs which are selective for the DAT over the other monoamine transporters (MATs) are listed below. For a list of DRIs that act at multiple MATs, see other monoamine reuptake inhibitor pages such as NDRI and SNDRI.

=== Selective dopamine reuptake inhibitors ===
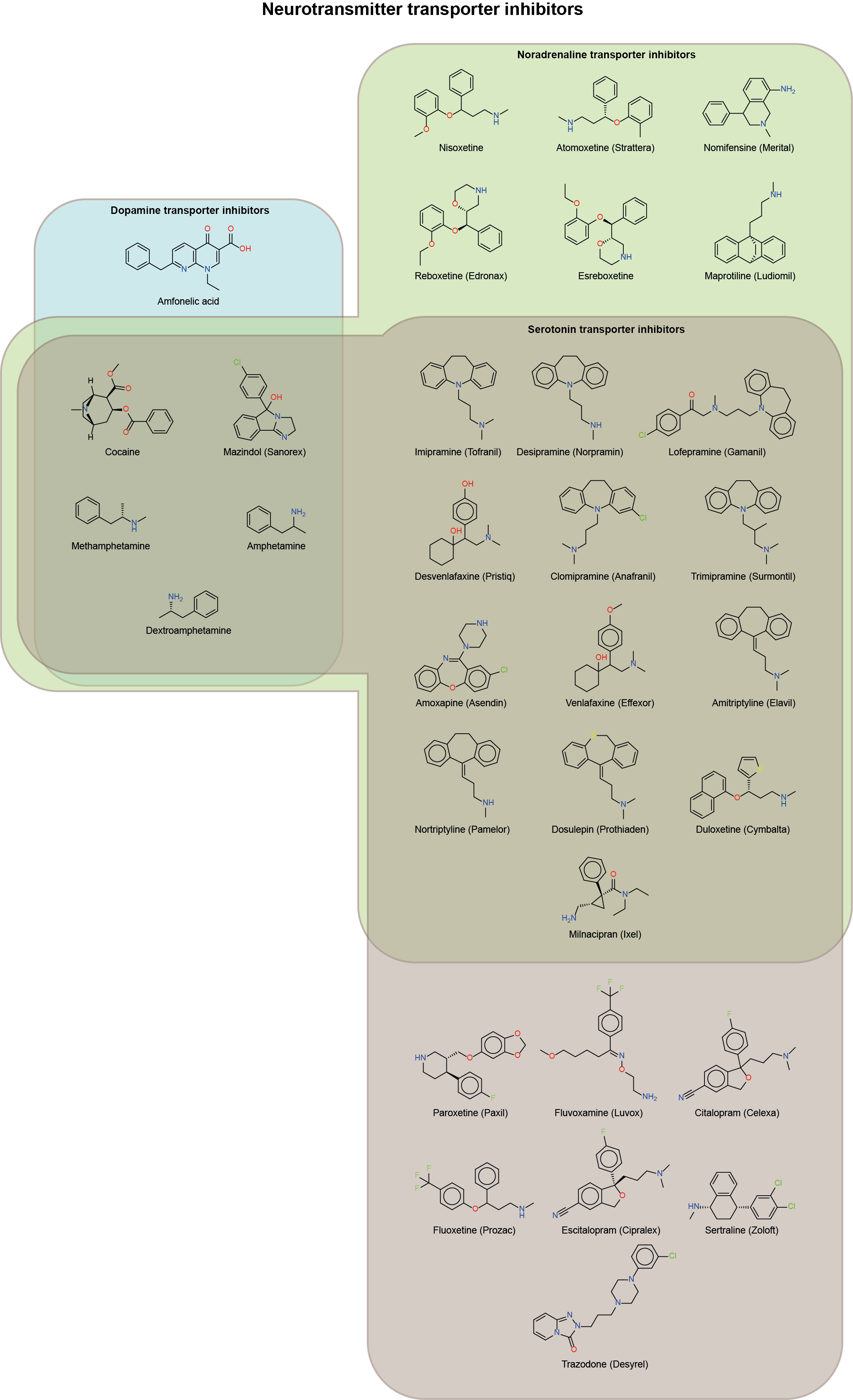
Neurotransmitter transporter inhibitors Dopamine transporter inhibitors

- α-Pyrrolidinoisohexanophenone (α-PiHP) - very strong and reasonably selective.
- 4-Hydroxy-1-methyl-4-(4-methylphenyl)-3-piperidyl 4-methylphenyl ketone
- Altropane (O-587)
- Amfonelic acid (WIN 25978)
- Amineptine (has a reasonable degree of selectivity for dopamine over norepinephrine reuptake inhibition)
- BTCP (GK-13)
- 3C-PEP
- DBL-583
- Difluoropine (O-620)
- GBR-12783
- GBR-12935
- GBR-13069
- GBR-13098
- GYKI-52895
- Iometopane (β-CIT, RTI-55)
- Ethylphenidate (more selective for DA vs NE reuptake inhibition compared to methylphenidate, but still has a marked effect on both)
- Modafinil (relatively weak but very selective for the dopamine transporter, with little to no effect on the norepinephrine or serotonin transporters)
- Armodafinil (R-enantiomer of modafinil; somewhat more potent at inhibiting DAT than racemic modafinil, with equally negligible action on NET and SERT)
- RTI-229
- Vanoxerine (GBR-12909)

=== DRIs with substantial activity at other sites ===
- Amantadine (also a weak NMDA receptor antagonist)
- Benztropine (also a muscarinic antagonist)
- Bupropion (also a more potent NRI and likely NRA due to bupropion's major metabolite hydroxybupropion)
- Cocaine
- Α-Pyrrolidinopentiophenone (one of the most potent NDRIs known)
- Fluorenol (extremely weak)
- Medifoxamine (relatively weak)
- Metaphit (irreversible; depletes dopamine)
- Methylphenidate (has a mild degree of selectivity for dopamine over norepinephrine reuptake inhibition, although it significantly affects both)
- Dexmethylphenidate (the dextro diastereomer (R,R steriomer) of methylphenidate; is theorized to be more potent (twice as potent on a milli-to-milli basis) than racemic methylphenidate)
- Nomifensine (also a norepinephrine reuptake inhibitor; is used for the treatment of clinical depression, attention deficit hyperactivity disorder (ADHD), narcolepsy, and Parkinson's disease).
- Phenylpiracetam
- Isopropylphenidate
- Rimcazole
- Venlafaxine (weak)
- Solriamfetol (also a norepinephrine reuptake inhibitor)

=== Other DRIs ===
- Chaenomeles speciosa (Flowering quince)
- Oroxylin A (found in Oroxylum indicum and Scutellaria baicalensis (Skullcap))

== See also ==
- Monoamine reuptake inhibitor
- Dopamine agonist
