= Lidoflazine =

Chemical compound

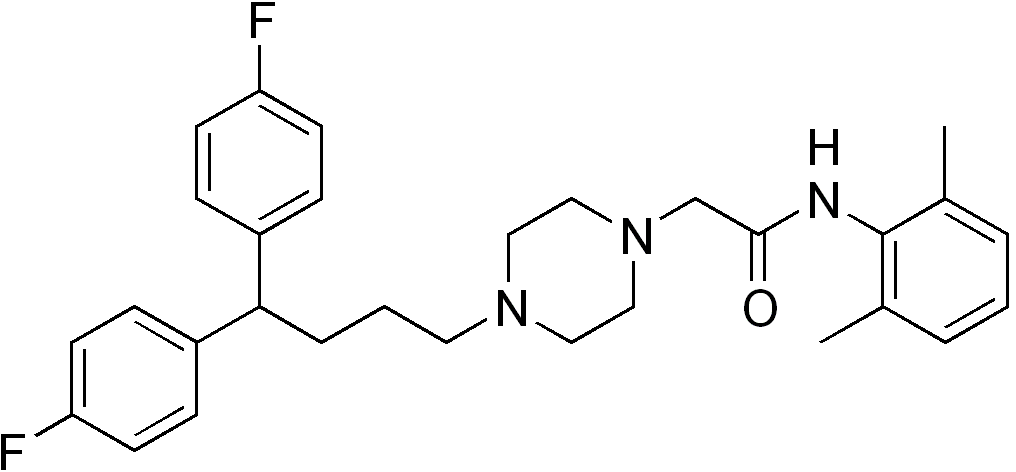

Clinical data
- AHFS/Drugs.com: International Drug Names
- ATC code: C08EX01 (WHO)

Identifiers
- IUPAC name: 2-[4-[4,4-bis(4-fluorophenyl)butyl]piperazin-1-yl]-N-(2,6-dimethylphenyl)acetamide
- CAS Number: 3416-26-0
- PubChem CID: 3926
- ChemSpider: 3789
- UNII: J4ZHN3HBTE
- KEGG: D04733
- CompTox Dashboard (EPA): DTXSID6045377
- ECHA InfoCard: 100.020.285

Chemical and physical data
- Formula: C_{30}H_{35}F_{2}N_{3}O
- Molar mass: 491.627 g·mol^{−1}
- 3D model (JSmol): Interactive image
- Melting point: 159 to 161 °C (318 to 322 °F)
- Solubility in water: Almost insoluble in water(<0.01%); Very soluble in chloroform(>50%); mg/mL (20 °C)
- SMILES: CC1=C(C(=CC=C1)C)NC(=O)CN2CCN(CC2)CCCC(C3=CC=C(C=C3)F)C4=CC=C(C=C4)F
- InChI: InChI=1S/C30H35F2N3O/c1-22-5-3-6-23(2)30(22)33-29(36)21-35-19-17-34(18-20-35)16-4-7-28(24-8-12-26(31)13-9-24)25-10-14-27(32)15-11-25/h3,5-6,8-15,28H,4,7,16-21H2,1-2H3,(H,33,36); Key:ZBIAKUMOEKILTF-UHFFFAOYSA-N

Lidoflazine is a piperazine calcium channel blocker. It is a coronary vasodilator with some antiarrhythmic action. Lidoflazine was discovered at Janssen Pharmaceutica in 1964. In 2025, Lidoflazine has also been reported to interact with tubulin and inhibit its polymerization.

== Physical properties ==
=== Solubility at room temperature ===
Extracted from

Solvent
0.01

N

0.1

N

%
pH
%
pH
Hydrochloric Acid
0.4
3.0
0.7
1.9
Tartaric Acid
0.3
3.1
1.0
2.5
Citric Acid
0.3
3.1
0.5
2.5
Lactic Acid
0.2
3.4
0.7
2.9
Acetic Acid
0.1
3.5
0.4
3.8
