= Depramine =

Chemical compound

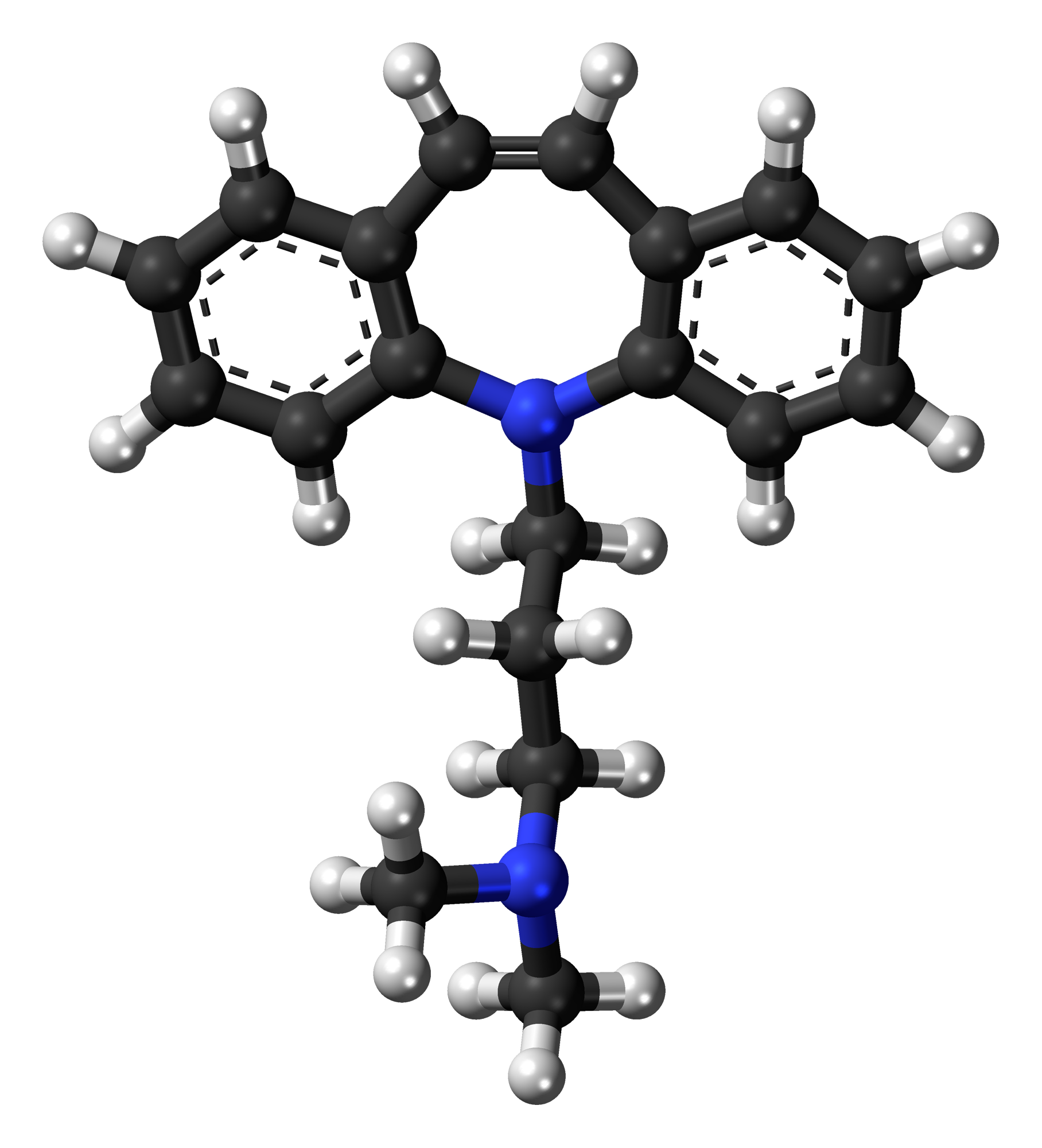

Clinical data
- ATC code: None

Identifiers
- IUPAC name: 3-(5H-dibenzo[b,f]azepin-5-yl)-N,N-dimethylpropan-1-amine
- CAS Number: 303-54-8
- PubChem CID: 67534
- ChemSpider: 60856
- UNII: 77C3T28736
- ChEMBL: ChEMBL2104158
- CompTox Dashboard (EPA): DTXSID90184388

Chemical and physical data
- Formula: C_{19}H_{22}N_{2}
- Molar mass: 278.399 g·mol^{−1}
- 3D model (JSmol): Interactive image
- SMILES: c3cc2c(\C=C/c1c(cccc1)N2CCCN(C)C)cc3

Depramine (INN; GP-31,406), also known as balipramine (BAN) and as 10,11-dehydroimipramine, is a tricyclic antidepressant (TCA) which was never marketed.

== See also ==
- Tricyclic antidepressant
