= Vanoxerine =

Chemical compound

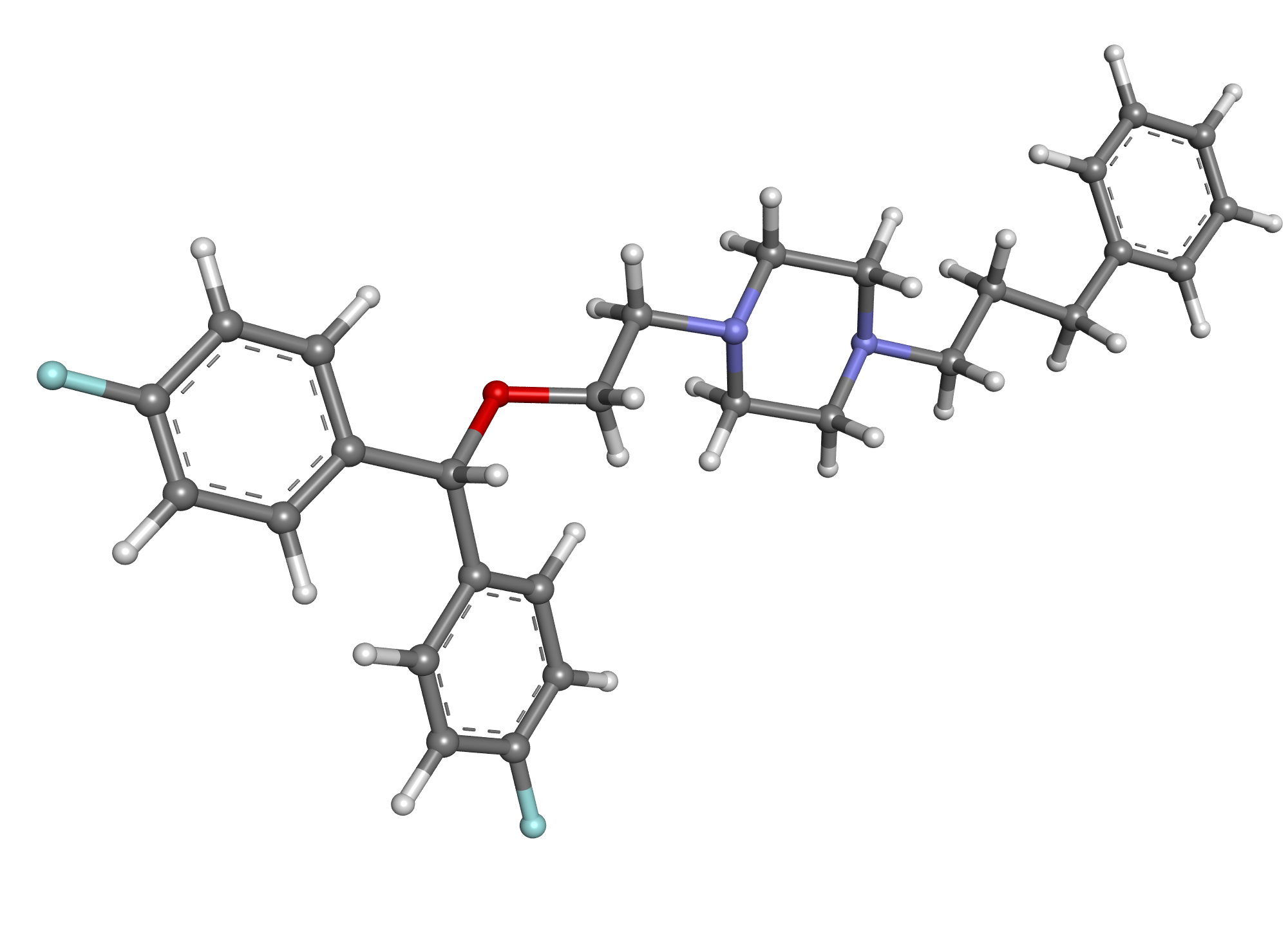

Clinical data
- Other names: GBR-12909; Boxeprazine; I-893
- ATC code: None

Pharmacokinetic data
- Elimination half-life: 6 hours approx

Identifiers
- IUPAC name: 1-[2-[bis(4-fluorophenyl)methoxy]ethyl]-4-(3-phenylpropyl)piperazine
- CAS Number: 67469-69-6; HCl: 67469-78-7
- PubChem CID: 3455
- DrugBank: DB03701; HCl: DBSALT001866
- ChemSpider: 3337; HCl: 94684
- UNII: 90X28IKH43; HCl: MWO1IP03EV
- ChEBI: CHEBI:64089; HCl: CHEBI:64086
- ChEMBL: ChEMBL281594
- CompTox Dashboard (EPA): DTXSID8045143

Chemical and physical data
- Formula: C_{28}H_{32}F_{2}N_{2}O
- Molar mass: 450.574 g·mol^{−1}
- 3D model (JSmol): Interactive image
- SMILES: Fc1ccc(cc1)C(OCCN2CCN(CC2)CCCc3ccccc3)c4ccc(F)cc4
- InChI: InChI=1S/C28H32F2N2O/c29-26-12-8-24(9-13-26)28(25-10-14-27(30)15-11-25)33-22-21-32-19-17-31(18-20-32)16-4-7-23-5-2-1-3-6-23/h1-3,5-6,8-15,28H,4,7,16-22H2; Key:NAUWTFJOPJWYOT-UHFFFAOYSA-N

Vanoxerine is an investigational drug which is being evaluated for the treatment of heart arrhythmias and cocaine dependence. Vanoxerine is a piperazine derivative which has multiple pharmacological activities including acting as an dopamine reuptake inhibitor, serotonin transporter inhibitor, and as a blocker of the cardiac hERG repolarizing potassium channel (IKr).

== Research ==
=== Treatment of cocaine dependence ===
Vanoxerine has been researched for use in treating cocaine dependence both as a substitute for cocaine and to block the rewarding effects. This strategy of using a competing agonist with a longer half-life has been successfully used to treat addiction to opiates such as heroin by substituting with methadone. It was hoped that vanoxerine would be of similar use in treating cocaine addiction.

Research also indicates that vanoxerine may have additional mechanisms of action including antagonist action at nicotinic acetylcholine receptors, and it has also been shown to reduce the consumption of alcohol in animal models of alcohol use disorder.

Vanoxerine has been through human trials up to Phase II, but development was stopped due to observed QTc effects in the context of cocaine use.

However, vanoxerine analogs continue to be studied as treatments for cocaine addiction. As an example, GBR compounds are piperazine based and contain a proximal and a distal nitrogen. It was found that piperidine analogs are still fully active DRIs, although they do not have any affinity for the "piperazine binding site" unlike the GBR compounds. Further SAR revealed that while there are 4 atoms connecting the two fluorophenyl rings to the piperazine, the ether in the chain could be omitted in exchange for a tertiary nitrogen. Vanoxerine, a blocker of the dopamine carrier devoid of action on the noradrenaline carrier, while greatly increasing dopamine in the nucleus accumbens, is ineffective in raising extracellular dopamine in the prefrontal cortex.

=== Antiarrhythmic ===
Vanoxerine is a potentially effective treatment for abnormal heart rhythms. A significant cause of abnormal heart rhythms is reentry, an electrophysiologic event in which the proliferating signal refuses to terminate, and endures to preexcite the heart after the refractory period.

It is likely that vanoxerine acts to prevent reentrant circuits. Vanoxerine terminates atrial flutters and atrial fibrillations (both cardiac abnormal heart rhythms) by blocking the recirculating electrical signal, and preventing the reformation of the reentrant circuit. Vanoxerine has also shown a tendency to reduce the recurrence of cardiac arrhythmias, as it was exceedingly difficult to reproduce an atrial flutter or fibrillation in a subject that had been taking vanoxerine.

Experiments have successfully been performed on cell cultures, canine hosts and testing has moved towards human trials.

In clinical human trials with increasing dosages, vanoxerine has shown to have a highly favourable therapeutic index, showing no side effects at concentrations much higher than the therapeutic dose. In canines, the effective therapeutic dose was between 76 ng/ml and 99 ng/ml, however the drug reached plasma concentrations of 550 ng/ml without harmful side effects, presenting a desirable therapeutic index.

One of the major benefits of vanoxerine is that it does not appear to cause the same harmful side effects as its most comparable contender, amiodarone.

=== Miscellaneous ===
Vanoxerine has paradoxically been found to potentiate the behavioral effects of methamphetamine in rodents.

== Pharmacology ==
=== Mechanism of action ===
Vanoxerine is a potent and selective dopamine reuptake inhibitor (DRI). Vanoxerine binds to the target site on the dopamine transporter (DAT) ~ 50 times more strongly than cocaine, but simultaneously inhibits the release of dopamine. This combined effect only slightly elevates dopamine levels, giving vanoxerine only mild stimulant effects. Vanoxerine has also been observed to be a potent blocker of the cardiac hERG repolarizing potassium channel (IKr) which has implicated Vanoxerine in having cardiotoxicity concerns. Vanoxerine also binds with nanomolar affinity to the serotonin transporter.

At a cellular level, vanoxerine acts to block cardiac ion channels. Vanoxerine is a multichannel blocker, acting on IKr (potassium), L-type calcium and sodium ion channels. By blocking these specific channels, there is a prolongation of the action potential of the cell, preventing reactivation by a reentrant circuit. The block is strongly frequency dependant: as the pacing of the heart increases so does the frequency of ion channel blocking by vanoxerine.

== Society and culture ==
=== History ===
Vanoxerine is a drug that was in the midst of recruiting participants for a phase III human clinical trial for its use as a cardiac antiarrhythmic when safety concerns arose. It had passed phase IIb human trials without any concerns but the company, Laguna Pharmaceuticals, found safety issues which prompted them to shut down their company and the $30 million effort to produce a new heart medication. It was previously indicated as a treatment for Parkinson's disease and depression; however, it had no significant benefit with these diseases.

== Chemistry ==
=== Synthesis ===
Vanoxerine is a piperazine with two different alkyl sidechains attached. Its synthesis uses a tert-butyloxycarbonyl protecting group (Boc group) to mask the reactivity of one of its nitrogen atoms while the other is alkylated.

Reaction of 1-Boc-piperazine (1) and (3-bromopropyl)benzene (2) gives (3) which, after removal of the Boc group using acid gives 1-(3-phenylpropyl)piperazine (4). Separately, a Grignard reaction using two equivalents of 4-fluorophenylmagnesium bromide (5) with ethyl formate (6) results in the formation of bis(4-fluorophenyl)methanol (7). Ether formation with 2-chloroethanol (8) in the presence of phosphoric acid gives the second alkylation partner (9). This is combined with (4) in a convergent synthesis to yield vanoxerine.

== See also ==
- DBL-583, a derivative of vanoxerine with longer duration of action
- A related dopamine reuptake inhibitor based on a 4,4-diphenylbutylpiperazine is called PR-000608 [143759-63-1].
