= List of antidepressants =

This is a complete list of clinically approved prescription antidepressants throughout the world, as well as clinically approved prescription drugs used to augment antidepressants or mood stabilizers, by pharmacological and/or structural classification. Chemical/generic names are listed first, with brand names in parentheses. All drugs listed are approved specifically for major depressive disorder unless noted otherwise.

== Selective serotonin reuptake inhibitors (SSRIs) ==
Selective serotonin reuptake inhibitors include:

- Citalopram (Celexa, Cipramil)
- Escitalopram (Lexapro, Cipralex)
- Fluoxetine (Prozac, Sarafem)
- Fluvoxamine (Luvox, Faverin)
- Paroxetine (Paxil, Seroxat)
- Sertraline (Zoloft, Lustral)

=== Discontinued/withdrawn ===
- Indalpine (Upstene)
- Zimelidine (Normud, Zelmid)

== Serotonin–norepinephrine reuptake inhibitors (SNRIs) ==
Serotonin–norepinephrine reuptake inhibitors include:

- Desvenlafaxine (Pristiq)
- Duloxetine (Cymbalta)
- Levomilnacipran (Fetzima)
- Milnacipran (Ixel, Savella, Milnaneurax)
- Venlafaxine (Effexor, Trevilor)

== Serotonin–dopamine reuptake inhibitor (SDRIs) ==
Serotonin–dopamine reuptake inhibitors include:

None currently marketed

=== Discontinued/withdrawn ===
- Medifoxamine (Clédial, Gerdaxy)

== Serotonin–norepinephrine–dopamine reuptake inhibitors (SNDRIs) ==
Serotonin–norepinephrine–dopamine reuptake inhibitors include:

- Dextromethorphan/bupropion (Auvelity)
- Toludesvenlafaxine (Ruoxinlin)
- Nefazodone (Serzone)

== Serotonin modulators and stimulators (SMSs) ==
Serotonin modulators and stimulators include:

- Vilazodone (Viibryd)
- Vortioxetine (Trintellix, Brintellix)

== Serotonin antagonist and reuptake inhibitors (SARIs) ==
Serotonin antagonist and reuptake inhibitors include:

- Nefazodone (Dutonin, Nefadar, Serzone) – withdrawn/discontinued in most countries
- Trazodone (Desyrel)

=== Discontinued/withdrawn ===
- Etoperidone (Axiomin, Etonin)

== Norepinephrine reuptake inhibitors (NRIs) ==
Norepinephrine reuptake inhibitors include:

- Reboxetine (Edronax)
- Teniloxazine (Lucelan, Metatone) – also a 5-HT_{2A} receptor antagonist
- Viloxazine (Qelbree, formerly Vivalan) – also a 5-HT_{2B} receptor antagonist and 5-HT_{2C} receptor agonist

=== Off-label only ===
- Atomoxetine (Strattera)

== Norepinephrine–dopamine reuptake inhibitors (NDRIs) ==
Norepinephrine–dopamine reuptake inhibitors include:

- Bupropion (Wellbutrin, Elontril) – also a non-competitive antagonist of nicotinic acetylcholine receptors

=== Off-label only ===
- Amphetamines (Adderall, Vyvanse) – actually norepinephrine–dopamine releasing agents (NDRAs)
- Methylphenidate (Ritalin, Concerta)

=== Discontinued/withdrawn ===
- Amineptine (Survector, Maneon)
- Nomifensine (Merital, Alival)

== Tricyclic antidepressants (TCAs) ==
Tricyclic antidepressants include:

- Amitriptyline (Elavil, Endep)
- Amitriptylinoxide (Amioxid, Ambivalon, Equilibrin)
- Amoxapine (Asendin)
- Clomipramine (Anafranil)
- Desipramine (Norpramin, Pertofrane)
- Dibenzepin (Noveril, Victoril)
- Dimetacrine (Istonil)
- Dosulepin (Prothiaden)
- Doxepin (Adapin, Sinequan)
- Imipramine (Tofranil)
- Lofepramine (Lomont, Gamanil)
- Melitracen (Dixeran, Melixeran, Trausabun)
- Nitroxazepine (Sintamil)
- Nortriptyline (Pamelor, Aventyl)
- Noxiptiline (Agedal, Elronon, Nogedal)
- Pipofezine (Azafen/Azaphen)
- Protriptyline (Vivactil)
- Trimipramine (Surmontil)

Opipramol (Insidon), tianeptine (Stablon, Coaxil) and amineptine (discontinued; formerly Survector, Maneon) are chemically TCAs but are pharmacodynamically atypical, and are therefore grouped elsewhere.

=== Discontinued/withdrawn ===
- Butriptyline (Evadyne)
- Demexiptiline (Deparon, Tinoran)
- Fluacizine (Phtorazisin)
- Imipraminoxide (Imiprex, Elepsin)
- Iprindole (Prondol, Galatur, Tetran)
- Metapramine (Timaxel)
- Propizepine (Depressin, Vagran)
- Quinupramine (Kinupril, Kevopril)
- Tiazesim (Altinil) – actually not a TCA but a tricyclic-like antidepressant
- Tofenacin (Elamol, Tofacine) – actually not a TCA but a tricyclic-like antidepressant

== Tetracyclic antidepressants (TeCAs) ==
Tetracyclic antidepressants include:

- Maprotiline (Ludiomil)
- Mianserin (Tolvon)
- Mirtazapine (Remeron)
- Setiptiline (Tecipul)

Mianserin, mirtazapine, and setiptiline are also sometimes described as noradrenergic and specific serotonergic antidepressants (NaSSAs).

== Monoamine oxidase inhibitors (MAOIs) ==
Monoamine oxidase inhibitors include

=== Irreversible ===
==== Non-selective ====
- Isocarboxazid (Marplan)
- Phenelzine (Nardil)
- Tranylcypromine (Parnate)

Discontinued/withdrawn

- Benmoxin (Neuralex)
- Iproclozide (Sursum)
- Iproniazid (Marsilid)
- Mebanazine (Actomol)
- Nialamide (Niamid)
- Octamoxin (Ximaol)
- Pheniprazine (Catron)
- Phenoxypropazine (Drazine)
- Pivhydrazine (Tersavid)
- Safrazine (Safra)

==== Selective for MAO-B ====
- Selegiline (Eldepryl, Zelapar, Emsam) – also a catecholaminergic activity enhancer and weak norepinephrine releasing agent (via metabolites)

=== Reversible ===
==== Non-selective ====
Discontinued/withdrawn

- Caroxazone (Surodil, Timostenil)

==== Selective for MAO-A ====
- Metralindole (Inkazan)
- Moclobemide (Aurorix, Manerix)
- Pirlindole (Pirazidol)

These drugs are sometimes described as reversible inhibitors of MAO-A (RIMAs).

Discontinued/withdrawn

- Eprobemide (Befol)
- Minaprine (Brantur, Cantor)
- Toloxatone (Humoryl)

=== Mixed ===
==== Non-selective ====
- Bifemelane (Alnert, Celeport) – RIMA, irreversible inhibitor of MAO-B, and weak NRI

== Atypical antipsychotics ==
Atypical antipsychotics include:

- Amisulpride (Solian) – approved in low doses as a monotherapy for persistent depression and major depressive disorder
- Levosulpiride – approved in low doses for major depressive disorder
- Lumateperone (Caplyta) – approved as a monotherapy for bipolar depression
- Lurasidone (Latuda) – approved as a monotherapy for bipolar depression
- Quetiapine (Seroquel) – approved as a monotherapy for bipolar depression
- Sulpiride – approved in low doses as a monotherapy for major depressive disorder

== Others ==
=== Marketed ===
- D-Phenylalanine (DPA, D-Phe; Deprenon, Sabiben, Sabiden) – enkephalinase inhibitor
- Agomelatine (Valdoxan) – 5-HT_{2C} receptor antagonist and MT_{1} and MT_{2} receptor agonist
- Brexanolone (allopregnanolone; Zulresso) – GABA_{A} receptor positive allosteric modulator – approved for postpartum depression
- Dextromethorphan/bupropion (Auvelity) – various actions
- Esketamine (Spravato) – non-competitive NMDA receptor antagonist, other actions
- Gepirone (Exxua) – 5-HT_{1A} receptor partial agonist and α_{2}-adrenergic receptor antagonist
- Opipramol (Insidon) — σ_{1} receptor agonist, other actions
- Tianeptine (Stablon, Coaxil, Tianeurax) – weak and atypical μ-opioid receptor agonist, other actions
- Zuranolone (Zurzuvae) – GABA_{A} receptor positive allosteric modulator – approved for postpartum depression and major depressive disorder

=== Off-label only ===
- Ketamine (Ketalar) – non-competitive NMDA receptor antagonist

=== Discontinued/withdrawn ===
- α-Methyltryptamine [αMT] (Indopan) – non-selective serotonin receptor agonist, serotonin–norepinephrine–dopamine releasing agent (SNDRA), and weak RIMA
- Etryptamine [α-Ethyltryptamine (αET)] (Monase) – non-selective serotonin receptor agonist, SNDRA, and weak RIMA
- Indeloxazine (Elen, Noin) – serotonin releasing agent (SRA), NRI, and NMDA receptor antagonist
- Oxaflozane (Conflictan) – 5-HT_{1A}, 5-HT_{2A}, and 5-HT_{2C} receptor agonist
- Pivagabine (Tonerg) – unknown/unclear mechanism of action

=== Over-the-counter ===
The following antidepressants are available both with a prescription and over-the-counter:

- Ademetionine [S-Adenosyl-L-methionine (SAMe)] (Heptral, Transmetil, Samyl) – cofactor in monoamine neurotransmitter biosynthesis
- Hypericum perforatum [St. John's Wort (SJW)] (Jarsin, Kira, Movina) – TRPC6 activator, and various other actions
- Oxitriptan [5-Hydroxytryptophan (5-HTP)] (Cincofarm, Levothym, Triptum) – precursor in serotonin biosynthesis
- Tryptophan (Tryptan, Optimax, Aminomine) – precursor in serotonin biosynthesis

== Adjunctive treatments ==
=== Atypical antipsychotics ===
Atypical antipsychotics include:

- Aripiprazole (Abilify) – approved as an adjunct to antidepressant for major depression
- Brexpiprazole (Rexulti) – approved as an adjunct to antidepressant for major depression
- Lumateperone (Caplyta) – approved as an adjunct to mood stabilizer for bipolar depression
- Lurasidone (Latuda) – approved as an adjunct to mood stabilizer for bipolar depression
- Olanzapine (Zyprexa) – approved as an adjunct to antidepressant for major depression
- Quetiapine (Seroquel) – approved as an adjunct to antidepressant or mood stabilizer for major depression and bipolar depression

==== Off-label only ====
- Risperidone (Risperdal)

=== Typical antipsychotics ===
Typical antipsychotics include:

==== Off-label only ====
- Trifluoperazine (Stelazine)

=== Others ===
==== Off-label only ====
- Buspirone (Buspar) – 5-HT_{1A} receptor partial agonist
- Lithium (Eskalith, Lithobid) – mood stabilizer (mechanism of action unknown/unclear)
- Thyroxine (T_{4}) – thyroid hormone (thyroid hormone receptor agonist)
- Triiodothyronine (T_{3}) – thyroid hormone (thyroid hormone receptor agonist)

== Combination products ==
- Amitriptyline/chlordiazepoxide (Limbitrol) – TCA and benzodiazepine combination
- Amitriptyline/perphenazine (Etafron) – TCA and typical antipsychotic combination
- Dextromethorphan/bupropion (Auvelity) – non-competitive NMDA receptor antagonist, σ_{1} receptor agonist, SNRI, NDRI, other actions
- Flupentixol/melitracen (Deanxit) – TCA and typical antipsychotic combination
- Olanzapine/fluoxetine (Symbyax) – SSRI and atypical antipsychotic combination – approved as a monotherapy for bipolar depression and treatment-resistant depression
- Tranylcypromine/trifluoperazine (Parstelin, Parmodalin, Jatrosom N, Stelapar) – MAOI and typical antipsychotic combination

== See also ==
- List of investigational antidepressants
