= C11H16N2O2 =

The molecular formula C_{11}H_{16}N_{2}O_{2} (molar mass: 208.25 g/mol) may refer to:

- Aloracetam
- Aminocarb
- Carbenzide, or carbazic acid
- Pilocarpine
- Safrazine
