= C8H12N2 =

The molecular formula C_{8}H_{12}N_{2} (molar mass: 136.19 g/mol, exact mass: 136.100048) may refer to:

- Betahistine, an anti-vertigo drug
- Dimethyl-4-phenylenediamine
- Mebanazine
- Phenelzine
- Tetramethylpyrazine
- Tetramethylsuccinonitrile
- Xylylenediamines
  - m-Xylylenediamine
  - o-Xylylenediamine
  - p-Xylylenediamine
