= C18H19N3O4 =

The molecular formula C_{18}H_{19}N_{3}O_{4} (molar mass: 341.36 g/mol, exact mass: 341.1376 u) may refer to:

- L-655,708 (FG-8094)
- Nitroxazepine
