= Metfendrazine =

Chemical compound

Clinical data
- Other names: Methphendrazine; HM-11; MO-482; N-Aminomethamphetamine; Methamphetamine hydrazide; N-Amino-N-methylamphetamine
- Routes of administration: Oral
- ATC code: none

Legal status
- Legal status: In general: uncontrolled

Identifiers
- IUPAC name: 1-methyl-1-(1-methyl-2-phenyl-ethyl)hydrazine
- CAS Number: 3734-26-7
- PubChem CID: 19516
- ChemSpider: 18390
- UNII: A52QTC656T
- CompTox Dashboard (EPA): DTXSID701257364

Chemical and physical data
- Formula: C_{10}H_{16}N_{2}
- Molar mass: 164.252 g·mol^{−1}

Metfendrazine (developmental code names HM-11, MO-482), also known as methphendrazine, is an irreversible and nonselective monoamine oxidase inhibitor (MAOI) of the hydrazine family. It was investigated as an antidepressant, but was never marketed.

== Chemistry ==
Metfendrazine, also known as methamphetamine hydrazide, is a phenethylamine, amphetamine, and hydrazine derivative.

It is an analogue and derivative of phenelzine (phenethylamine hydrazide) and pheniprazine (amphetamine hydrazide), as well as of phenethylamine, amphetamine, and methamphetamine.
