= C16H18N4O2 =

The molecular formula C_{16}H_{18}N_{4}O_{2} (molar mass: 298.34 g/mol, exact mass: 298.1430 u) may refer to:

- Piribedil
- Nialamide
