= C7H16N2 =

The molecular formula C_{7}H_{16}N_{2} (molar mass: 128.22 g/mol, exact mass: 128.1313 u) may refer to:

- Cimemoxin, or cyclohexylmethohydrazine
