= C12H18N2O =

The molecular formula C_{12}H_{18}N_{2}O (molar mass: 206.28 g/mol, exact mass: 206.1419 u) may refer to:

- Isoproturon
- Oxotremorine
- Pivhydrazine, also known as pivalylbenzhydrazine or pivazide
