= Domoxin =

Chemical compound

Clinical data
- ATC code: None

Identifiers
- IUPAC name: 1-benzyl-1-(2,3-dihydro-1,4-benzodioxin-2-ylmethyl)hydrazine
- CAS Number: 61-74-5
- PubChem CID: 208853
- ChemSpider: 180960
- UNII: 5C0K1GQB2L
- ChEMBL: ChEMBL2105038
- CompTox Dashboard (EPA): DTXSID90861602

Chemical and physical data
- Formula: C_{16}H_{18}N_{2}O_{2}
- Molar mass: 270.332 g·mol^{−1}
- 3D model (JSmol): Interactive image
- SMILES: O1c3c(OC(C1)CN(N)Cc2ccccc2)cccc3
- InChI: InChI=1S/C16H18N2O2/c17-18(10-13-6-2-1-3-7-13)11-14-12-19-15-8-4-5-9-16(15)20-14/h1-9,14H,10-12,17H2; Key:IXTXYSAWZICAPV-UHFFFAOYSA-N

Domoxin (INN) is a hydrazine derivative monoamine oxidase inhibitor (MAOI) antidepressant which was never marketed.

== See also ==
- Monoamine oxidase inhibitor
- Hydrazine (antidepressant)
