= Hydrazine (antidepressant) =

Group of antidepressants

Iproniazid, the first hydrazine MAOI to be discovered.

The hydrazine antidepressants are a group of non-selective, irreversible monoamine oxidase inhibitors (MAOIs) which were discovered and initially marketed in the 1950s and 1960s. Most have been withdrawn due to toxicity, namely hepatotoxicity, but a few still remain in clinical use.

Tranylcypromine, a structurally unrelated MAOI introduced around the same time as the hydrazines, was originally advertised as non-hydrazine as a result of its diminished propensity for causing hepatotoxicity.

== List of hydrazine antidepressants ==
=== Marketed ===
- Benmoxin (Neuralex, Nerusil) ^{‡}
- Iproclozide (Sursum) ^{‡}
- Iproniazid (Marsilid) ^{‡}
- **Isocarboxazid** (Marplan)
- Mebanazine (Actomol) ^{‡}
- Nialamide (Niamid) ^{‡}
- Octamoxin (Ximaol, Nimaol) ^{‡}
- **Phenelzine** (Nardil)
- Pheniprazine (Catron) ^{‡}
- Phenoxypropazine (Drazine) ^{‡}
- Pivhydrazine (Tersavid) ^{‡}
- Safrazine (Safra) ^{‡}

Legend: ^{‡} = Withdrawn from the market; ^{†} = Partially discontinued; Bolded names indicate major drugs.

=== Never marketed ===
- Carbenzide
- Cimemoxin
- Domoxin
- Metfendrazine

=== Parkinson's ===
- Carbidopa

=== Tranquillosedative ===
- Centazolone
