= Pheniprazine =

Chemical compound

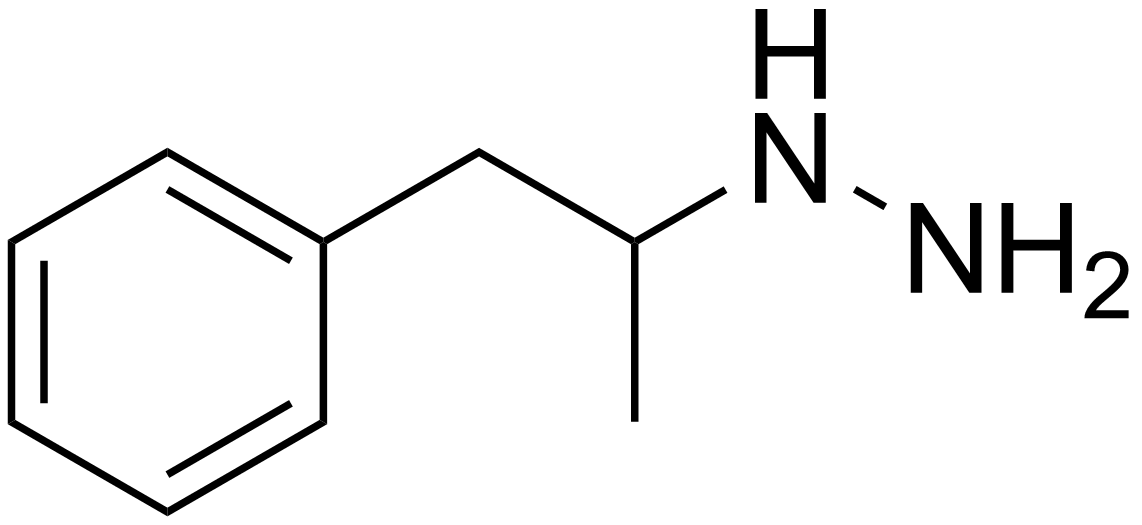

Clinical data
- Trade names: Catron, Cavodil
- Other names: Amphetamine hydrazide; α-Methylphenethylhydrazine; JB-516; α-Methylphenelzine; N-Aminoamphetamine
- Routes of administration: Oral
- ATC code: None

Legal status
- Legal status: BR: Class C1 (Other controlled substances); In general: uncontrolled

Identifiers
- IUPAC name: (1-Methyl-2-phenyl-ethyl)hydrazine
- CAS Number: 55-52-7
- PubChem CID: 5929
- ChemSpider: 5716
- UNII: 37VKD7067M
- ChEMBL: ChEMBL22498
- CompTox Dashboard (EPA): DTXSID6043838
- ECHA InfoCard: 100.000.215

Chemical and physical data
- Formula: C_{9}H_{14}N_{2}
- Molar mass: 150.225 g·mol^{−1}
- InChI: InChI=1S/C9H14N2/c1-8(11-10)7-9-5-3-2-4-6-9/h2-6,8,11H,7,10H2,1H3; Key:VXTWEDPZMSVFEF-UHFFFAOYSA-N

Pheniprazine, formerly sold under the brand names Catron and Cavodil, is an irreversible and non-selective monoamine oxidase inhibitor (MAOI) of the hydrazine group that was used as an antidepressant to treat depression in the 1960s. It was also used in the treatment of angina pectoris and schizophrenia. Pheniprazine has been largely discontinued due to toxicity concerns such as jaundice, amblyopia, and optic neuritis.

== Pharmacology ==
Pheniprazine is a monoamine oxidase inhibitor (MAOI).

Amphetamine has been detected as an active metabolite of pheniprazine in animals. Pheniprazine produces amphetamine- and psychostimulant-like effects at high doses in animals. The same is true of certain other MAOIs, including iproniazid, phenelzine, tranylcypromine, and pargyline, but not nialamide.

== Chemistry ==
Pheniprazine, also known as α-methylphenethylhydrazine, is a phenethylamine, amphetamine, and hydrazine derivative.

It is a close analogue of phenelzine (phenethylhydrazine) and amphetamine (α-methylphenethylamine) and can also be referred to by synonyms including amphetamine hydrazide, α-methylphenelzine, and N-aminoamphetamine.

Metfendrazine (α,N-dimethylphenethylhydrazine; N-methylpheniprazine) is the corresponding methamphetamine (N-methylamphetamine) analogue.

== Society and culture ==
=== Names ===
Pheniprazine is the generic name of the drug and its INN and BAN. It is also known by the former developmental code name JB-516.
