= Hysteroid dysphoria =

Repeated episodes of depressed mood from feeling rejected

Hysteroid dysphoria is a name given to repeated episodes of depressed mood in response to feeling rejected.

There is a common misconception surrounding whether hysteroid dysphoria and rejection sensitivity are the same disorder. Hysteroid dysphoria was previously defined in psychiatry as 'Rejection Sensitive Hysteroid Dysphoria'. This definition was changed to hysteroid dysphoria. Thus, hysteroid dysphoria and rejection sensitivity are sometimes used interchangeably.

Currently, hysteroid dysphoria is regarded as an outdated term amongst most psychiatric diagnostic manuals, such as the DSM-5. Thus, this disorder is not formally classified as a social personality disorder. However, the symptoms of hysteroid dysphoria remain prevalent across a variety of social personality and mood disorders. The overlap between hysteroid dysphoria and borderline personality disorder has been noted in clinical literature, as both conditions share features of rejection sensitivity and emotional dysregulation.

== Symptoms ==
Hysteroid dysphoria has been described in outpatient populations and is thought to be a subtype of atypical depression involving rejection sensitivity and therapeutic response to monoamine oxidase inhibitors.

The most prominent symptoms associated with hysteroid dysphoria include low-self esteem and intense feelings of rejection. In response to this, individuals may feel a tendency to withdraw from social situations.

As a result, individuals with hysteroid dysphoria are susceptible to experiencing social isolation, loneliness, and difficulties with forming and sustaining romantic relationships.

Notably, symptoms of hysteroid dysphoria may vary in how they are displayed. The symptoms can be categorised as either 'internal' or 'external'. The internal symptoms refer to the cognitive and emotional experiences that may not be observable to others. The external symptoms of hysteroid dysphoria affect social interactions. They can be displayed as a physiological expression of the internal mental processes that are a consequence of the disorder.

== Studies ==
The term 'hysteroid dysphoria' was first introduced into the field of psychiatry by Klein and Liebowitz in 1979. Their pioneering work derived from research conducted on a subgroup of depressed patients, reporting a consistent pattern of "repeated depressed moods in response to feeling rejected" among the participants.

Other studies have examined the symptoms associated with hysteroid dysphoria and found that while the symptoms are observable, they are not unique or distinct enough to be considered their own condition. In 2006, Spitzer and Williams conducted research to identify the syndromal validity of hysteroid dysphoria. In a sample of 1,324 patients identified with symptoms of mild depression, 3.1% displayed atypical features. These patients were not more likely to display more atypical features than others. Thus, Spitzer and Williams concluded that hysteroid dysphoria does not meet criteria to be acknowledged as a distinct syndrome.

== Contributing factors ==
=== Biological factors ===
The biological explanations of the causes of hysteroid dysphoria remain limited. However, it has been suggested that the dysregulation of the production of the oxytocin receptor gene (OXTR) is associated with the onset of hysteroid dysphoric symptoms. This has been suggested due to the oxytocin hormone being associated with regulating behaviours related to social affiliation and emotional regulation. Thus, the dysfunction of this hormone can lead to difficulties with social bonding and social cognition, specifically the ability to interpret social cues.

Additional research indicates that cortical association influences the development of symptoms associated with hysteroid dysphoria. Feelings of social rejection activate cortical regions that are also linked to physical pain, including the anterior insula and the dorsal anterior cingulate cortex.

=== Environmental factors ===
Wider societal changes have been identified as influencing factors in the onset of hysteroid dysphoria. For instance, recent research has discovered that the COVID-19 pandemic has enhanced psychiatric symptoms. Individuals reported a lack of social connectedness as a response to the periods of social isolation. This reinforced the symptoms of hysteroid dysphoria, specifically intense feelings of social rejection.

Social interactions with others also contribute to the development of symptoms associated with hysteroid dysphoria . The role of peer victimisation has been discovered as a possible influence in heightened rejection sensitivity amongst individuals. A study of 1039 adolescents analysed the multiple dimensions of peer victimisation: experience of bullying, physical and social aggression, and sexual harassment. The correlational findings displayed that peer victimisation is strongly associated with higher levels of rejection sensitivity amongst participants.

== Treatment ==
While some research shows that hysteroid dysphoria responds well to MAOIs, other research has suggested that the difference actually comes from the condition being less sensitive to tricyclic antidepressants. Tricyclic antidepressants are regarded as unsuccessful treatment for hysteroid dysphoria particularly due to this medication being specialised for treating typical forms of depression, rather than atypical forms, such as hysteroid dysphoria.

MAOIs have been identified as a successful biological treatment for hysteroid dysphoric individuals. This is due to MAOIs catering to forms of treatment-resistant depression. The side effects of MAOIs vary across users, and may include insomnia, weight gain, and sexual dysfunction.

If the use of MAOIs have proven to be ineffective in reducing the symptoms of hysteroid dysphoria, other forms of treatment include psychotherapy. This enables individuals with such symptoms learn how to effectively process their emotions and exert greater control of their emotional responses.

== Criticisms ==
=== Co-morbidity ===
The inability for hysteroid dysphoria to be classified as its own unique condition is attributed to its co-morbidity with other disorders. The symptoms of hysteroid dysphoria share similarities with a variety of mood disorders. Some of which include:

- Histrionic personality disorder, characterized by an overwhelming desire to be noticed by others.
- Bipolar disorder due to the instability of emotions.
- Social anxiety disorder due to the withdrawal from social situations in response to feeling rejected.

ADHD has been identified as highly co-morbid with hysteroid dysphoria. One notable similarity lies in the comparable structure of the neuroendocrine system. Neuroimaging research has revealed that ADHD targets hypothalamic pituitary adrenal (HPA), a region of the brain that governs and regulates bodily stress. This has shown to induce symptoms of hysteroid dysphoria among individuals. Further analysis of brain scans suggests that both disorders result from interference in the brain's communication systems, specifically systems that govern emotion and attention.

=== Methodological issues ===
Much of the understanding of hysteroid dysphoria is based on research with predominantly female participants. Consequently, this has led to a common misconception that hysteroid dysphoria is most prevalent amongst women. However, some research has suggested that the symptoms of hysteroid dysphoria manifest differently across men and women. The degree of rejection sensitivity in participants was measured using a 'rejection sensitive questionnaire' and attitudes towards intimacy were identified using a 'fear of intimacy scale'. Analysis of the gender differences in intimate relationships has shown that females with higher rejection sensitivity display greater fear of intimate relationships compared to their male counterparts. Some differences included females displaying greater hostility in relationships whereas men may display subtle signs of jealousy.

Some research has suggested that the symptoms of hysteroid dysphoria may be sufficient to define this as a distinct disorder. Research has discovered some differences between ADHD and hysteroid dysphoria, particularly in terms of the duration of the disorders. ADHD has been identified as a life-long disorder whereas symptoms associated with hysteroid dysphoria are regarded as "brief" and tend to "dissipate rapidly." This observation has prompted a focus on the potential for hysteroid dysphoria to be distinct from ADHD, with some suggestion that this disorder may instead be a sub-symptom of ADHD.

== See also ==
- Dysphoria
- Depression
