= Carbenzide =

Chemical compound

Clinical data
- ATC code: None

Identifiers
- IUPAC name: ethyl 2-(1-phenylethyl)hydrazinecarboxylate
- CAS Number: 3240-20-8
- PubChem CID: 18608
- ChemSpider: 17575
- UNII: 2V9J52KYM0
- ChEMBL: ChEMBL2105955
- CompTox Dashboard (EPA): DTXSID80863130

Chemical and physical data
- Formula: C_{11}H_{16}N_{2}O_{2}
- Molar mass: 208.261 g·mol^{−1}
- 3D model (JSmol): Interactive image
- SMILES: O=C(OCC)NNC(c1ccccc1)C
- InChI: InChI=1S/C11H16N2O2/c1-3-15-11(14)13-12-9(2)10-7-5-4-6-8-10/h4-9,12H,3H2,1-2H3,(H,13,14); Key:MSIUIUDKTKNUET-UHFFFAOYSA-N

Carbenzide (INN) is a hydrazine derivative monoamine oxidase inhibitor antidepressant which was never marketed.

== See also ==
- Monoamine oxidase inhibitor
- Hydrazine (antidepressant)
