= Cimemoxin =

Chemical compound

Clinical data
- ATC code: None

Identifiers
- IUPAC name: cyclohexylmethylhydrazine
- CAS Number: 3788-16-7
- PubChem CID: 71824
- ChemSpider: 64848
- UNII: 584QS921R2
- ChEMBL: ChEMBL2106052
- CompTox Dashboard (EPA): DTXSID30191314

Chemical and physical data
- Formula: C_{7}H_{16}N_{2}
- Molar mass: 128.219 g·mol^{−1}
- 3D model (JSmol): Interactive image
- SMILES: NNCC1CCCCC1
- InChI: InChI=1S/C7H16N2/c8-9-6-7-4-2-1-3-5-7/h7,9H,1-6,8H2; Key:BDHMBGHSWFWYSP-UHFFFAOYSA-N

Cimemoxin (INN), or cyclohexylmethylhydrazine, is a hydrazine monoamine oxidase inhibitor (MAOI) antidepressant which was never marketed.

== Synthesis ==
It possesses 50 times the relative activity of iproniazid and 25x nialamide (see patent).

Synthesis:

3-Cyclohexene-1-carbaldehyde [100-50-5] (a.k.a. 1,2,3,6-Tetrahydrobenzaldehyde) is reacted with N-acetylhydrazine to give the hydrazone, which is reduced by catalytic hydrogenation. The acetyl group is removed by acid hydrolysis.

== See also ==
- Monoamine oxidase inhibitor
- Hydrazine (antidepressant)
