= Phenoxypropazine =

Chemical compound

Clinical data
- Routes of administration: Oral
- ATC code: none

Legal status
- Legal status: In general: ℞ (Prescription only)

Identifiers
- IUPAC name: (1-methyl-2-phenoxy-ethyl)hydrazine
- CAS Number: 3818-37-9
- PubChem CID: 71467
- ChemSpider: 64548
- UNII: 8E92V52324
- ChEMBL: ChEMBL1909286
- CompTox Dashboard (EPA): DTXSID1048837

Chemical and physical data
- Formula: C_{9}H_{14}N_{2}O
- Molar mass: 166.224 g·mol^{−1}

Phenoxypropazine (trade name Drazine) is an irreversible and non-selective monoamine oxidase inhibitor (MAOI) of the hydrazine family. It was introduced as an antidepressant in 1961, but was subsequently withdrawn in 1966 due to hepatotoxicity concerns.

== See also ==
- Hydrazine (antidepressant)
