= Mebanazine =

Chemical compound

Clinical data
- Routes of administration: Oral
- ATC code: none

Legal status
- Legal status: In general: ℞ (Prescription only)

Identifiers
- IUPAC name: 1-phenylethylhydrazine
- CAS Number: 65-64-5
- PubChem CID: 6179
- ChemSpider: 5944
- UNII: Z5R55CJ4CG
- ChEMBL: ChEMBL1909283
- CompTox Dashboard (EPA): DTXSID50859848
- ECHA InfoCard: 100.000.559

Chemical and physical data
- Formula: C_{8}H_{12}N_{2}
- Molar mass: 136.198 g·mol^{−1}

Mebanazine (trade name Actomol) is a monoamine oxidase inhibitor (MAOI) of the hydrazine chemical class that was previously used as an antidepressant in the 1960s, but has since been withdrawn due to hepatotoxicity.

Mebanazine in animals is claimed to be a more potent MAOI than pheniprazine with a greater therapeutic index.

== See also ==
- Hydrazine (antidepressant)
