= Heterocyclic antidepressant =

Heterocyclic antidepressants inhibit the nerve cells' ability to reuptake norepinephrine and serotonin. This group of drugs, once the mainstay of treatment, include:

- Tricyclic antidepressants
- Tetracyclic antidepressants
- Tiazesim, an old antidepressant that is tricyclic and heterocyclic.
