= Hydracarbazine =

Chemical compound

Clinical data
- ATC code: none

Identifiers
- IUPAC name: 6-Hydrazinylpyridazine-3-carboxamide
- CAS Number: 3614-47-9
- PubChem CID: 71653
- ChemSpider: 64713
- UNII: 6CTK2FB9QM
- ChEMBL: ChEMBL2106246
- CompTox Dashboard (EPA): DTXSID30189716
- ECHA InfoCard: 100.020.717

Chemical and physical data
- Formula: C_{5}H_{7}N_{5}O
- Molar mass: 153.145 g·mol^{−1}
- 3D model (JSmol): Interactive image
- SMILES: C1=CC(=NN=C1C(=O)N)NN

Hydracarbazine is a pyridazine that has found use as an antihypertensive agent.
