= Aminocarb =

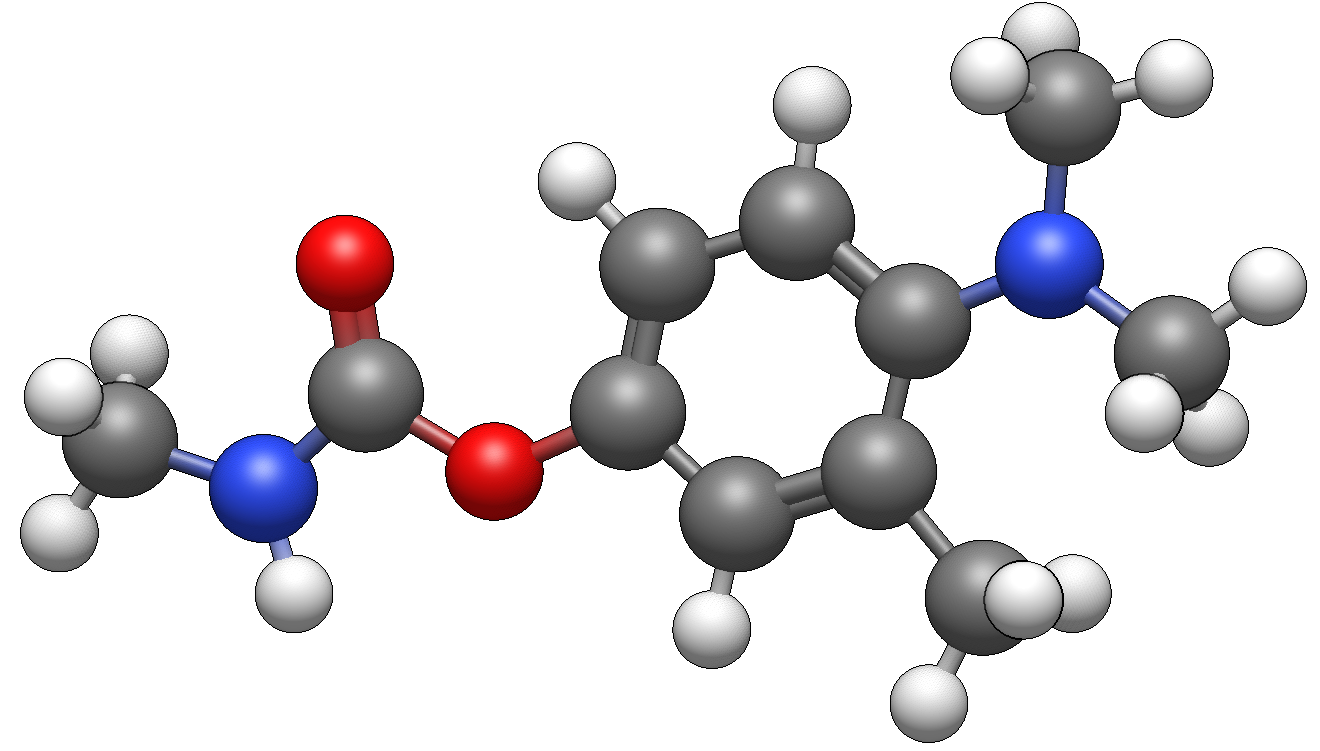

Names
- Preferred IUPAC name 4-(Dimethylamino)-3-methylphenyl methylcarbamate
- Other names 4-Dimethylamino-3-methylphenyl, N-Methylcarbamate

Identifiers
CAS Number	2032-59-9
3D model (JSmol)	Interactive image
Beilstein Reference	2808681
ChEBI	CHEBI:2653
ChemSpider	15416
ECHA InfoCard	100.016.356
EC Number	217-990-7
PubChem CID	16247
RTECS number	FC0175000
UNII	767M03K32Y
UN number	2811
CompTox Dashboard (EPA)	DTXSID7022172
- InChI: InChI=1S/C11H16N2O2/c1-8-7-9(15-11(14)12-2)5-6-10(8)13(3)4/h5-7H,1-4H3,(H,12,14)
- SMILES: Cc1cc(ccc1N(C)C)N(C)C([O-])=O

Properties
Chemical formula	C_{11}H_{16}N_{2}O_{2}
Molar mass	208.261 g·mol^{−1}
Appearance	White crystalline solid or tan crystals
Melting point	95.0 °C (203.0 °F; 368.1 K)
Boiling point	298 °C (568 °F; 571 K)
Solubility in water	Soluble
Solubility in other solvents	Soluble in polar org solvents; moderately soluble in aromatic solvents
Vapor pressure	1.88 X 10-6 mm Hg
Henry's law constant (k_{H})	5.64 X 10-10 atm cu m/mole

Hazards
- Occupational safety and health (OHS/OSH)
Main hazards	Maybe highly toxic by ingestion, toxic by skin absorption
- GHS labelling
Pictograms	(GHS09: Environmental hazard) (GHS06: Toxic)
Signal word	Danger
Hazard statements	H301, H311, H400, H411
Precautionary statements	P264, P273, P280, P301+P310, P312
NFPA 704 (fire diamond)	2 1 0
Flash point	181 °C (358 °F; 454 K)
- Lethal dose or concentration (LD, LC)
LD_{50} (median dose)	Oral-rat-30 mg/kg and Dermal-rat-275 mg/kg
- Safety data sheet (SDS)

Related compounds
- Except where otherwise noted, data are given for materials in their standard state (at 25 °C [77 °F], 100 kPa). Infobox references

Animocarb (Matacil) is an organic chemical compound with the molecular formula C_{11}H_{16}N_{2}O_{2}. It has a colorless or white crystal-like appearance and is most commonly used as an insecticide.

== History ==
Aminocarb has been extensively used in eastern Canada since 1976 in order to control the spruce budworm. The fate of this chemical in the ecosystem and detection of aminocarb was studied by the use of two-dimensional thin-layer chromatography. The use of thin-layer chromatography helped isolate and identify the methyl amino, amino and hydroxymethyl analogues from the in vitro metabolism of aminocarb by liver homogenates from humans and rats.

== Production and uses ==
Aminocarb is a carbamate insecticide widely used to protect cotton fields, crop fields, and forests from insect infestation. It helps in the control of aphids, soil mollusks, lepidopterous larvae, and other types of chewing insects. It is most commonly administered as an aerosol spray.

== Reactions ==
Aminocarb can be degraded through irradiation and hydrolysis.

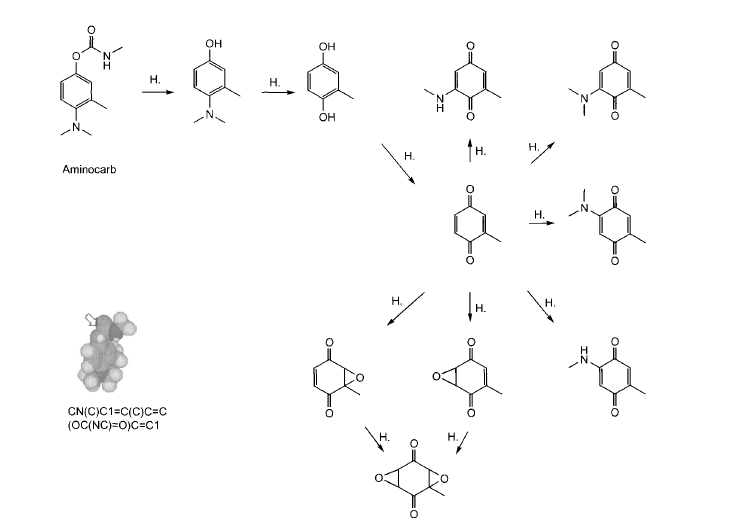
Hydrolysis of aminocarb

=== Irradiation ===
Aminocarb can be broken down by short-wave ultraviolet radiation. Irradiation is often carried out by a high pressure xenon-mercury lamp. Irradiating aminocarb in ethyl alcohol and cyclohexene solutions initially causes the oxidation of the dimethylamine moiety. The process eventually leads to the formation of a 4-dimethylamino-3-methyl phenol product.

=== Hydrolysis ===
Aminocarb undergoes hydrolysis to 4-dimethylamino-3-methylphenol in 25 °C purified water when pH of the water is 6.4. 4-dimethylamino-3-methylphenol is then either directly or via 2-methyl-1,4-dihydorquinone converted to 2-methyl-1,4-benzoquinone. If methylamine or diethylamine are present in the solution 2-methyl-1,4-benzoquinone will readily react. Monoepoxides and diepoxides of 2-methyl-1,4-benzoquinone are formed.

== Biomedical effects ==
In an experiment where young brown bullhead were exposed to aminocarb at lethal and sublethal concentrations, their tissue distribution was examined and showed that the concentration of residues in each tissue increased with the concentration of exposure of aminocarb. The liver and stomach/intestine had the highest amount of accumulation of residues.

Aminocarb is also known as a cholinesterase inhibitor that has nervous system effects causing convulsions and respiratory failure. It can also be absorbed through the skin, causing long-term effects to the nervous system and liver.
