= Iproclozide =

Chemical compound

Clinical data
- Routes of administration: Oral
- ATC code: N06AF06 (WHO)

Legal status
- Legal status: BR: Class C1 (Other controlled substances); In general: uncontrolled

Identifiers
- IUPAC name: 2-(4-chlorophenoxy)-N-isopropyl-acetohydrazide
- CAS Number: 3544-35-2
- PubChem CID: 19063
- ChemSpider: 17998
- UNII: 1II9D6CB3J
- KEGG: D07338
- ChEMBL: ChEMBL91238
- CompTox Dashboard (EPA): DTXSID70188925
- ECHA InfoCard: 100.020.536

Chemical and physical data
- Formula: C_{11}H_{15}ClN_{2}O_{2}
- Molar mass: 242.70 g·mol^{−1}
- 3D model (JSmol): Interactive image
- SMILES: Clc1ccc(OCC(=O)NNC(C)C)cc1
- InChI: InChI=1S/C11H15ClN2O2/c1-8(2)13-14-11(15)7-16-10-5-3-9(12)4-6-10/h3-6,8,13H,7H2,1-2H3,(H,14,15); Key:GGECDTUJZOXAAR-UHFFFAOYSA-N

Iproclozide (trade names Sursum, Sinderesin) is an irreversible and selective monoamine oxidase inhibitor (MAOI) of the hydrazine chemical class that was used as an antidepressant, but has since been discontinued. It has been known to cause fulminant hepatitis and there have been at least three reported fatalities due to administration of the drug.

== See also ==
- Hydrazine (antidepressant)
