= Benmoxin =

Chemical compound

Clinical data
- Routes of administration: Oral
- ATC code: None

Legal status
- Legal status: In general: ℞ (Prescription only)

Identifiers
- IUPAC name: N'-(1-phenylethyl)benzohydrazide
- CAS Number: 7654-03-7
- PubChem CID: 71671
- ChemSpider: 64728
- UNII: XC9FY2SGBG
- ChEMBL: ChEMBL1877495
- CompTox Dashboard (EPA): DTXSID0046220
- ECHA InfoCard: 100.028.745

Chemical and physical data
- Formula: C_{15}H_{16}N_{2}O
- Molar mass: 240.306 g·mol^{−1}
- 3D model (JSmol): Interactive image
- SMILES: O=C(NNC(c1ccccc1)C)c2ccccc2
- InChI: InChI=1S/C15H16N2O/c1-12(13-8-4-2-5-9-13)16-17-15(18)14-10-6-3-7-11-14/h2-12,16H,1H3,(H,17,18); Key:BEWNZPMDJIGBED-UHFFFAOYSA-N

Benmoxin (trade names Neuralex, Nerusil), also known as mebamoxine, is an irreversible and nonselective monoamine oxidase inhibitor (MAOI) of the hydrazine class. It was synthesized in 1967 and was subsequently used as an antidepressant in Europe, but is now no longer marketed.

== See also ==
- Hydrazine (antidepressant)
