= Eprobemide =

Chemical compound

Clinical data
- Trade names: Befol (RU)
- Other names: Befol
- Routes of administration: Oral

Legal status
- Legal status: In general: ℞ (Prescription only)

Identifiers
- IUPAC name: 4-Chloro-N-[3-(4-morpholinyl)propyl]benzamide
- CAS Number: 87940-60-1
- PubChem CID: 65659
- ChemSpider: 59094
- UNII: URX5F7RDER
- ChEMBL: ChEMBL2104298
- CompTox Dashboard (EPA): DTXSID3046409

Chemical and physical data
- Formula: C_{14}H_{19}ClN_{2}O_{2}
- Molar mass: 282.77 g·mol^{−1}
- 3D model (JSmol): Interactive image
- SMILES: C1COCCN1CCCNC(=O)C2=CC=C(C=C2)Cl
- InChI: InChI=1S/C14H19ClN2O2/c15-13-4-2-12(3-5-13)14(18)16-6-1-7-17-8-10-19-11-9-17/h2-5H,1,6-11H2,(H,16,18); Key:YYFGRAGNYHYWEZ-UHFFFAOYSA-N

Eprobemide (INN) is a pharmaceutical drug that was used as an antidepressant in Russia (under the brand name Бефол/Befol). It is a non-competitive reversible inhibitor of monoamine oxidase A that exhibits selective action on serotonin deamination. Eprobemide differs from moclobemide only in the linker that connects the morpholine fragment with the chlorobenzamide — moclobemide has two carbon atoms while eprobemide has three. Its registration was cancelled on December 30, 2003.

== See also ==
- List of Russian drugs
