= Octamoxin =

- Skeletal formula of octamoxin

Names
- Preferred IUPAC name 1-Methylheptylhydrazine
- Systematic IUPAC name Octan-2-ylhydrazine

Identifiers
CAS Number	4684-87-1
3D model (JSmol)	Interactive image
ChemSpider	19587
PubChem CID	20811
UNII	0HXY3M6S54
CompTox Dashboard (EPA)	DTXSID80863438
- InChI: InChI=1S/C8H20N2/c1-3-4-5-6-7-8(2)10-9/h8,10H,3-7,9H2,1-2H3 Key: FODQIVGFADUBKE-UHFFFAOYSA-N
- SMILES: CCCCCCC(C)NN

Properties
Chemical formula	C_{8}H_{20}N_{2}
Molar mass	144.262 g·mol^{−1}
Density	0.831 g/mL
Boiling point	228 °C (442 °F; 501 K)

Pharmacology
Routes of administration	Oral

Related compounds
Related compounds	Tuaminoheptane
- Except where otherwise noted, data are given for materials in their standard state (at 25 °C [77 °F], 100 kPa). Infobox references

Octamoxin (trade names Ximaol, Nimaol), also known as 2-octylhydrazine, is an irreversible and nonselective monoamine oxidase inhibitor (MAOI) of the hydrazine class that was used as an antidepressant in the 1960s but is now no longer marketed.

== See also ==
- Hydrazine (antidepressant)
