= Nitroxazepine =

Chemical compound

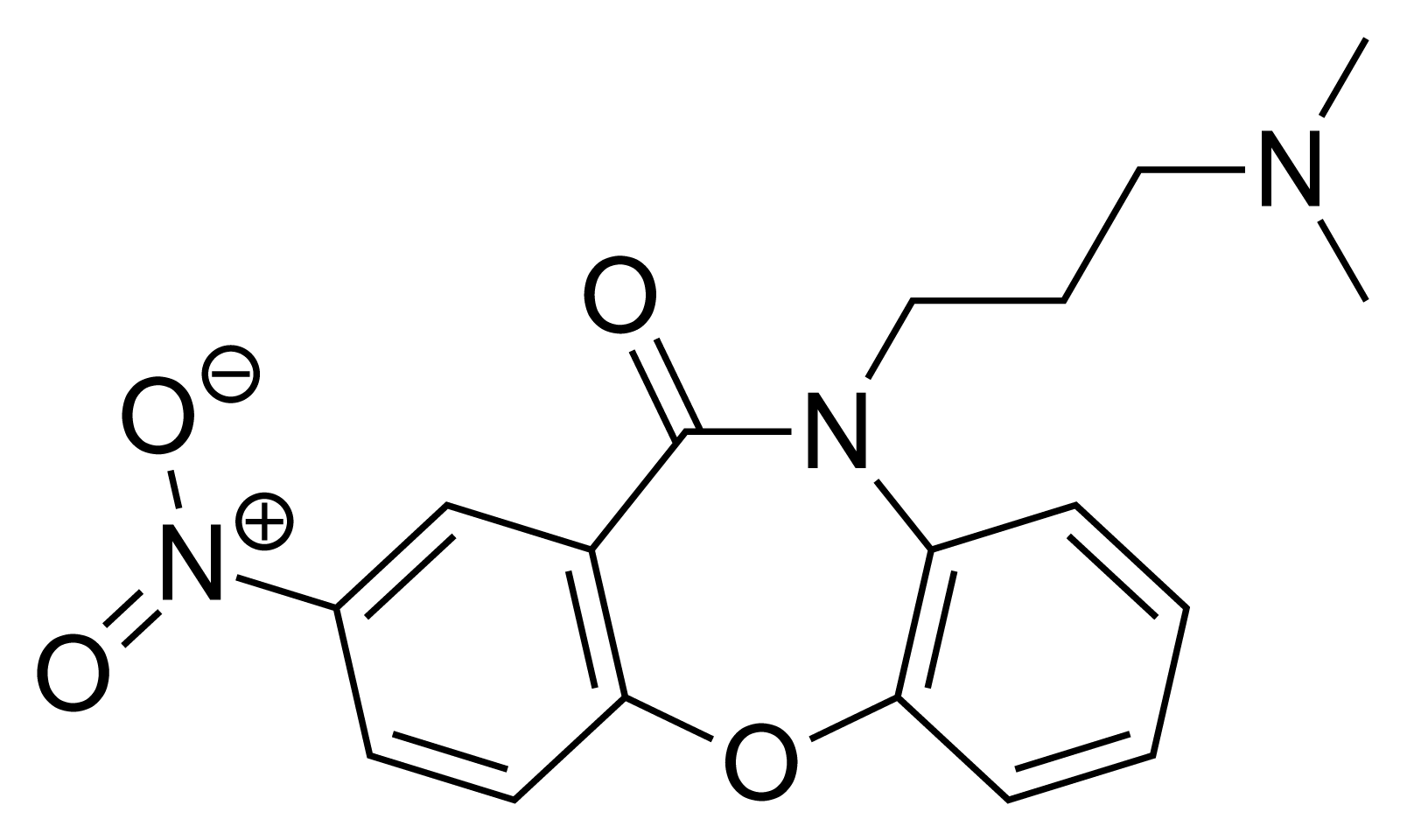

Clinical data
- Trade names: Sintamil
- Routes of administration: Oral
- ATC code: none

Legal status
- Legal status: In general: ℞ (Prescription only)

Identifiers
- IUPAC name: 10-[3-(dimethylamino)propyl]-2-nitrodibenzo[b,f][1,4]oxazepin-11(10H)-one
- CAS Number: 16398-39-3
- PubChem CID: 27857
- ChemSpider: 25919
- UNII: CNU9GY55SI
- ChEBI: CHEBI:135448
- CompTox Dashboard (EPA): DTXSID501027193

Chemical and physical data
- Formula: C_{18}H_{19}N_{3}O_{4}
- Molar mass: 341.367 g·mol^{−1}
- 3D model (JSmol): Interactive image
- SMILES: [O-][N+](=O)c2ccc1Oc3c(N(C(=O)c1c2)CCCN(C)C)cccc3
- InChI: InChI=1S/C18H19N3O4/c1-19(2)10-5-11-20-15-6-3-4-7-17(15)25-16-9-8-13(21(23)24)12-14(16)18(20)22/h3-4,6-9,12H,5,10-11H2,1-2H3; Key:CGYWLLGTCBIGSR-UHFFFAOYSA-N

Nitroxazepine (brand name Sintamil) is a tricyclic antidepressant (TCA) which was introduced by Ciba-Geigy (now Novartis) for the treatment of depression in India in 1982. It is also indicated for the treatment of nocturnal enuresis. Nitroxazepine acts as a serotonin-norepinephrine reuptake inhibitor and has similar effects to imipramine, but with certain advantages, such as lower anticholinergic side effects.
