= Isocarboxazid =

Irreversible non-selective MAO inhibitor and antidepressant drug

- Skeletal structure of isocarboxazid

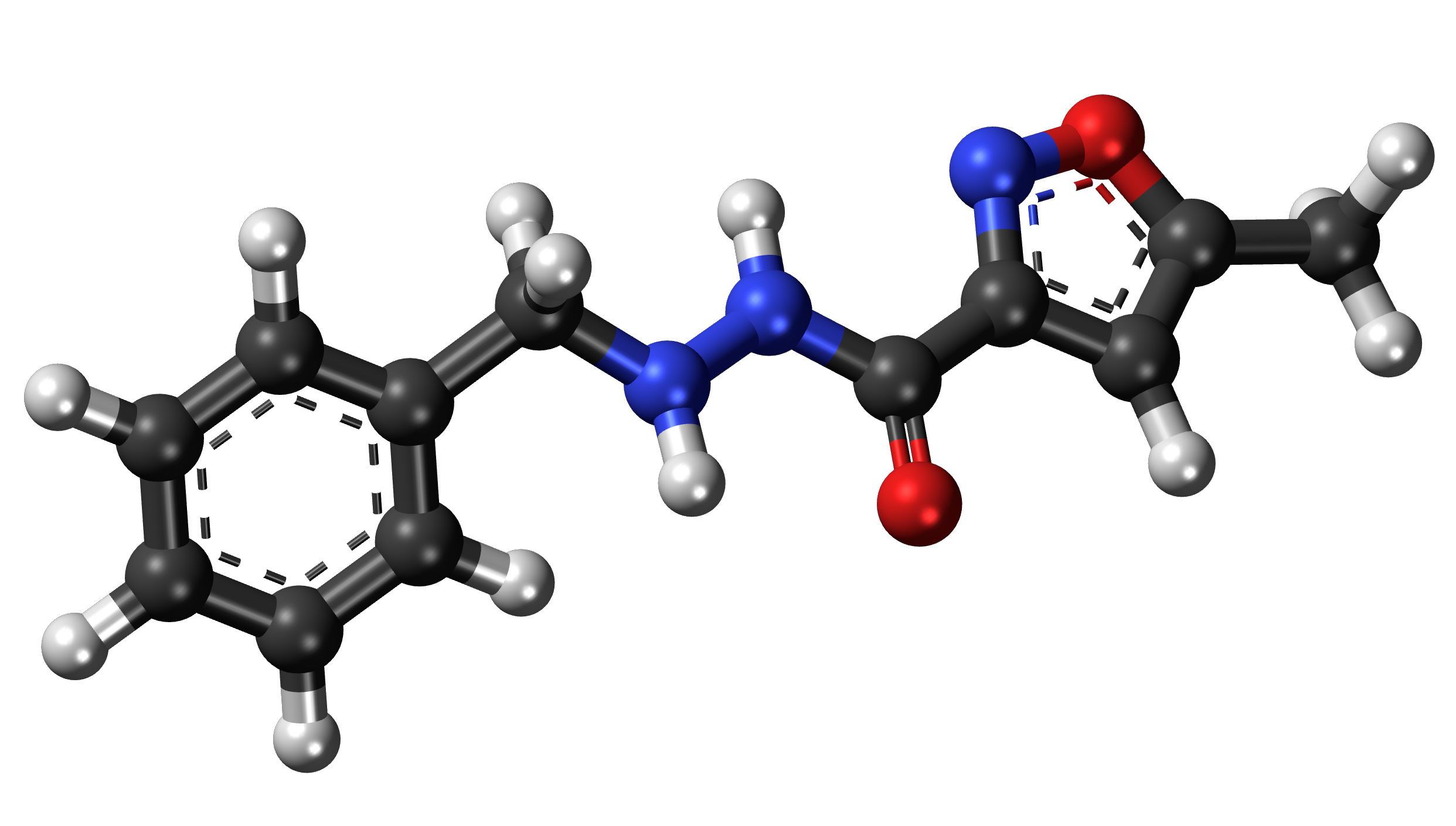
- Ball-and-stick model of isocarboxazid

Clinical data
- Trade names: Marplan, Enerzer
- AHFS/Drugs.com: Consumer Drug Information
- MedlinePlus: a605036
- Routes of administration: By mouth
- ATC code: N06AF01 (WHO)

Legal status
- Legal status: AU: S4 (Prescription only); BR: Class C1 (Other controlled substances); In general: ℞ (Prescription only)

Pharmacokinetic data
- Bioavailability: Low, peak at 1–2 h
- Metabolism: Liver (Carboxylesterase)
- Metabolites: Hippuric acid
- Elimination half-life: 1.5–4 h
- Excretion: Urine

Identifiers
- IUPAC name: N′-benzyl-5-methylisoxazole-3-carbohydrazide
- CAS Number: 59-63-2
- PubChem CID: 3759
- IUPHAR/BPS: 7204
- DrugBank: DB01247
- ChemSpider: 3628
- UNII: 34237V843T
- KEGG: D02580
- ChEMBL: ChEMBL1201168
- CompTox Dashboard (EPA): DTXSID4023171
- ECHA InfoCard: 100.000.399

Chemical and physical data
- Formula: C_{12}H_{13}N_{3}O_{2}
- Molar mass: 231.255 g·mol^{−1}
- 3D model (JSmol): Interactive image
- SMILES: O=C(NNCc1ccccc1)c2noc(c2)C
- InChI: InChI=1S/C12H13N3O2/c1-9-7-11(15-17-9)12(16)14-13-8-10-5-3-2-4-6-10/h2-7,13H,8H2,1H3,(H,14,16); Key:XKFPYPQQHFEXRZ-UHFFFAOYSA-N

Isocarboxazid, sold under the brand name Marplan among others, is a non-selective irreversible monoamine oxidase inhibitor (MAOI) of the hydrazine class. Along with phenelzine and tranylcypromine, it is one of the three classic irreversible, non-selective MAOIs used as antidepressants in modern psychiatric practice. Availability varies by country; in the United States, all three remain available for clinical use, though isocarboxazid is prescribed less often than phenelzine or tranylcypromine. Its lower use has been attributed in part to practical issues of affordability and availability, a smaller literature base, and the absence of an FDA-approved generic equivalent.

Isocarboxazid is used primarily in treatment-resistant depression. It has demonstrated efficacy in various depressive subtypes, including atypical depression, melancholic depression, and endogenous depression. Older studies also reported improvement in anxious depressive states, including nonpsychotic, nonmelancholic anxious depression and depressed patients with anxiety symptoms. The usual effective dose range is 30–60 mg/day, although expert clinicians have used doses up to 80 mg/day, with greater antidepressant effects as well as more side effects. It may also be considered as an alternative classic MAOI when phenelzine or tranylcypromine is not well tolerated, including when troublesome daytime somnolence, sedation, sleep disturbance, or other adverse effects limit treatment.

Although there is less comparative research and clinical use than for phenelzine or tranylcypromine, contemporary MAOI expert guidance describes isocarboxazid as a robust antidepressant that may rival them in efficacy and can be a reasonable first option. Its less prevalent use should not be interpreted as evidence of inferior antidepressant efficacy.

Isocarboxazid has also been investigated historically in other psychiatric and neurological conditions. Reports describe it among several MAO inhibitors tried in Parkinson's disease, alone or in combination with L-DOPA. When these early MAO inhibitors were used alone, effects were mild or absent, while they appeared to potentiate L-DOPA and also intensified adverse reactions. Evidence for Alzheimer's disease or other dementia-related disorders mainly concerns other MAO inhibitors, especially selegiline, rather than isocarboxazid specifically. Isocarboxazid has also been studied in bulimia nervosa; a small double-blind, placebo-controlled crossover trial reported reductions in binge eating and vomiting, although evidence remains limited.

== Pharmacology ==
=== Pharmacodynamics ===
Isocarboxazid, like other classic non-selective irreversible MAOIs, inhibits both monoamine oxidase A and monoamine oxidase B, reducing the breakdown of the monoamine neurotransmitters serotonin, norepinephrine, and dopamine. Unlike many conventional antidepressants, such as selective serotonin reuptake inhibitors, serotonin–norepinephrine reuptake inhibitors, and tricyclic antidepressants, classic MAOIs such as isocarboxazid affect all three major monoamine neurotransmitter systems and increase monoamine availability both within and outside neurons, rather than only producing a relative extracellular increase in the synaptic cleft. This broader mechanism may contribute to their antidepressant effectiveness in treatment-resistant cases.

=== Pharmacokinetics ===
Isocarboxazid has low oral bioavailability, reaches peak levels after about 1–2 hours, and has an elimination half-life of about 1.5–4 hours. It is metabolized in the liver by hydrolysis, without involvement of CYP2D6. As a result, dose adjustment based on CYP2D6 genetic polymorphisms is not required. This CYP2D6-independent metabolism distinguishes isocarboxazid from several antidepressants for which CYP2D6 genotype can meaningfully affect dosing or tolerability. Its reported metabolite is hippuric acid, and excretion is primarily urinary.

== Adverse effects and interactions ==
Isocarboxazid and other classic MAOIs are prescribed less often than newer antidepressants, partly because they require attention to dietary tyramine and drug interactions, and partly because many clinicians are less familiar with current use under updated dietary and interaction guidance.

Despite these limitations, classic MAOIs such as isocarboxazid continue to be considered clinically useful antidepressants, especially in treatment-resistant depression, and should not be regarded simply as drugs of last resort. The major interaction risks are mechanistically distinct: foods containing substantial tyramine can provoke hypertensive reactions, while drugs with significant serotonin reuptake inhibition or serotonin-releasing activity can precipitate serotonin syndrome.

Common adverse effects of isocarboxazid and other classic MAOIs include orthostatic hypotension, sleep disturbance, and nervousness or agitation. Contemporary MAOI guidance describes isocarboxazid as generally better tolerated than phenelzine, although adverse effects become more prominent at higher doses. Reported higher-dose effects include anticholinergic-type symptoms such as constipation, dry mouth, and urinary hesitancy, as well as increased carbohydrate cravings, insomnia, subjective weakness, edema, and rare hepatotoxicity; edema has been reported to respond to vitamin B_{6} supplementation in some cases.

== Contraindications and precautions ==
Isocarboxazid is contraindicated in certain patient populations and with certain interacting drugs or foods due to the risk of serious adverse reactions. Some notable contraindications and precautions include:

- Pheochromocytoma, because of the risk of severe hypertensive reactions.
- Significant liver disease; rare hepatotoxicity has been reported with isocarboxazid.
- Severe or clinically significant renal impairment, depending on individual risk assessment.
- Foods containing substantial amounts of tyramine, especially spoiled, aged, cured, fermented, or matured foods. This is a dietary restriction rather than a contraindication to treatment itself. Improved food standards and clearer dietary guidance have reduced the risk of severe tyramine-related blood-pressure reactions, although the risk has not been eliminated.
- Drugs with significant serotonin reuptake inhibition or serotonin-releasing activity, including selective serotonin reuptake inhibitors, serotonin–norepinephrine reuptake inhibitors, clomipramine, imipramine, tramadol, tapentadol, methadone, meperidine, and dextromethorphan.
- Use with another classic irreversible MAOI is generally avoided outside a planned specialist-supervised switch, because full MAO-A and MAO-B inhibition is already expected and evidence for routine long-term dual-MAOI treatment is limited. This is distinct from medically supervised switching between phenelzine, tranylcypromine, and isocarboxazid, where modified washouts or cautious transitions have been used by some expert clinicians under close monitoring. Classic MAOI-to-classic MAOI overlap is not expected to cause serotonin toxicity by itself unless another serotonergic drug with clinically significant serotonin reuptake inhibition or serotonin-releasing activity is also involved.
- Stimulant and sympathomimetic drugs vary in risk depending on mechanism, dose, and route. Medium- or high-dose amphetamines and MDMA are generally avoided because of monoamine-releasing activity, including serotonergic activity. Cocaine is also avoided, but mainly because of potent monoamine reuptake inhibition and sympathomimetic cardiovascular effects, rather than because it is a classic monoamine releaser. Low-dose amphetamines, including the amphetamine prodrug lisdexamfetamine, as well as ephedrine and pseudoephedrine, are relative contraindications rather than absolute contraindications; if used, reduced dosing, slow titration, and blood pressure monitoring are required. Other stimulants or wakefulness-promoting agents, such as methylphenidate, modafinil, and bupropion, are not automatically contraindicated but require low starting doses, slow titration, and monitoring when combined with MAOIs.
- Some specific antihypertensive drugs, such as methyldopa and reserpine, which are generally avoided with MAOIs. Antihypertensive drugs as a class are not contraindicated.
- Certain anesthetic-related drugs require avoidance or special caution, especially serotonergic opioid analgesics such as meperidine (pethidine) and tramadol, as well as pancuronium, a muscle relaxant sometimes used with general anesthetics. Other opioids listed as serotonergic or uncertain-risk include methadone, tapentadol, dextromethorphan, dextropropoxyphene, pentazocine, and levorphanol. Up-to-date MAOI literature does not support routine discontinuation of MAOI treatment before surgery or general anesthesia. In most cases, potentially serious interactions can be avoided through careful selection or dose adjustment of anesthetic, analgesic, and vasopressor agents before, during, and after surgery; the MAOI should not be discontinued without consultation with the prescribing clinician.

Stable hypertension is not itself a contraindication to classic MAOI treatment. Classic MAOIs commonly lower blood pressure and may cause orthostatic hypotension, particularly during treatment initiation and dose increases. Patients already taking antihypertensive medication may require blood pressure monitoring and dose adjustment to avoid excessive hypotension. Hypertensive reactions during MAOI treatment are mainly associated with tyramine ingestion or interacting sympathomimetic drugs, rather than with ordinary baseline hypertension itself.

== History and availability ==
Isocarboxazid was first approved in the United States in 1959. In 2007, Validus Pharmaceuticals announced that it had acquired Marplan. During a 2018 shortage, the U.S. Food and Drug Administration allowed temporary importation of another manufacturer's Marplan product to address limited U.S. supply. In late 2025, Validus transferred Marplan to Lifsa Pharma, and the American Society of Health-System Pharmacists later listed Lifsa's 10 mg Marplan tablets as available.

== See also ==
- Hydrazine (antidepressant)
