= Safrazine =

Pharmaceutical drug

Clinical data
- Other names: 4-benzo[1,3]dioxol-5-ylbutan-2-ylhydrazine; [3-(3,4-(methylenedioxy)phenyl)-1-butyl]hydrazine; 2-piperonylisopropylhydrazine
- Routes of administration: Oral
- ATC code: none

Legal status
- Legal status: In general: ℞ (Prescription only)

Identifiers
- IUPAC name: [3-(1,3-benzodioxol-5-yl)-1-methyl-propyl]hydrazine
- CAS Number: 33419-68-0
- PubChem CID: 34042
- ChemSpider: 31375
- UNII: F5G0P5378C
- CompTox Dashboard (EPA): DTXSID60860006

Chemical and physical data
- Formula: C_{11}H_{16}N_{2}O_{2}
- Molar mass: 208.261 g·mol^{−1}
- 3D model (JSmol): Interactive image
- SMILES: CC(CCc2ccc1OCOc1c2)NN

Safrazine (Safra) is a non-selective, irreversible monoamine oxidase inhibitor (MAOI) of the hydrazine class that was introduced as an antidepressant in the 1960s, but has since been discontinued alongside several old generation MAOIs in favor of the invention of RIMAs and more efficacious treatments for depression in general.

== See also ==
- Hydrazine (antidepressant)
