= Pivhydrazine =

Chemical compound

Clinical data
- Other names: Angorvid, Betamezid, Neomarsilid, Pivazide, Pivhydrazine
- Routes of administration: Oral
- ATC code: none

Legal status
- Legal status: In general: ℞ (Prescription only)

Identifiers
- IUPAC name: N'-benzyl-2,2-dimethyl-propanehydrazide
- CAS Number: 306-19-4
- PubChem CID: 9375
- ChemSpider: 9007
- UNII: TK1T520ASG
- ChEMBL: ChEMBL2106941
- CompTox Dashboard (EPA): DTXSID50184667
- ECHA InfoCard: 100.005.620

Chemical and physical data
- Formula: C_{12}H_{18}N_{2}O
- Molar mass: 206.289 g·mol^{−1}
- InChI: InChI=1S/C12H18N2O/c1-12(2,3)11(15)14-13-9-10-7-5-4-6-8-10/h4-8,13H,9H2,1-3H3,(H,14,15); Key:FWWDFDMCZLOXQI-UHFFFAOYSA-N

Pivhydrazine (trade name Tersavid), also known as pivalylbenzhydrazine and pivazide, is an irreversible and non-selective monoamine oxidase inhibitor (MAOI) of the hydrazine family. It was formerly used as an antidepressant in the 1960s, but has since been discontinued.

== See also ==
- Hydrazine (antidepressant)
