= Nialamide =

Antidepressant

- Molecular structure of nialamide

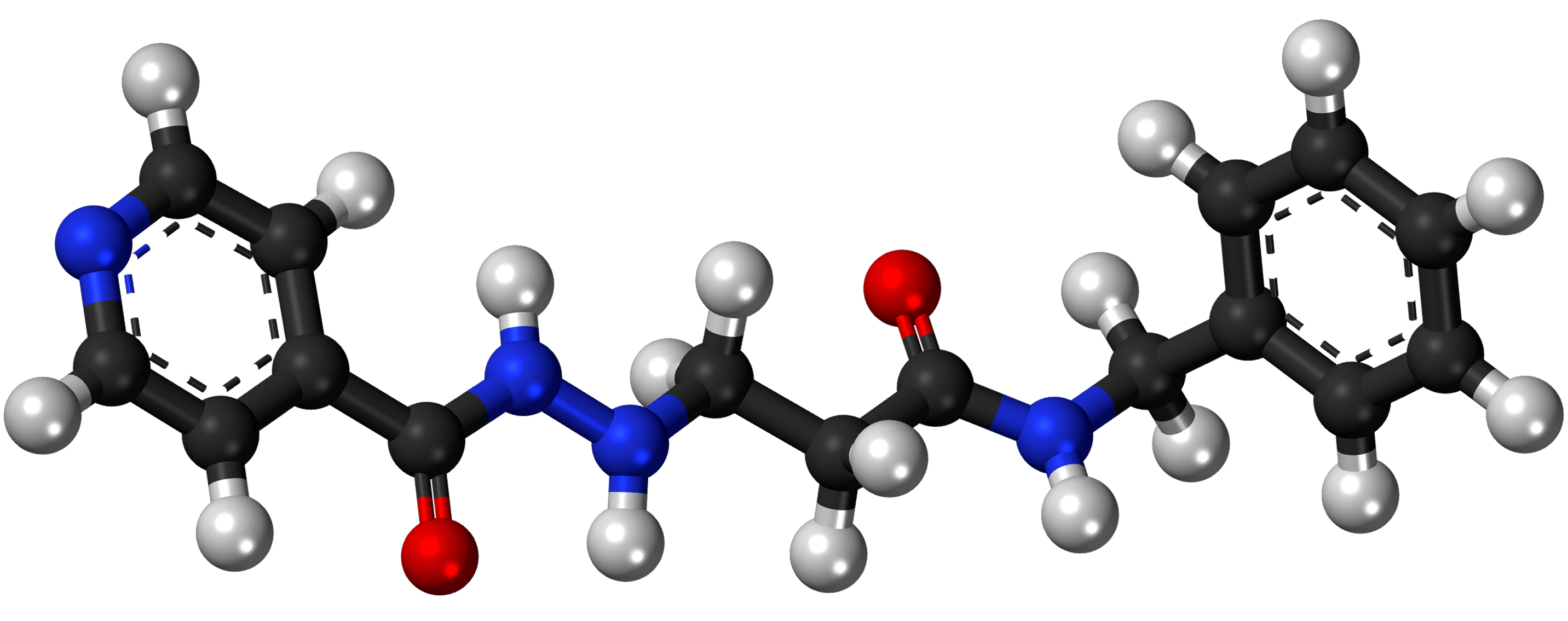
- 3D representation of a nialamide molecule

Clinical data
- AHFS/Drugs.com: International Drug Names
- Routes of administration: Oral
- ATC code: N06AF02 (WHO)

Legal status
- Legal status: AU: S4 (Prescription only); BR: Class C1 (Other controlled substances)

Identifiers
- IUPAC name: N-benzyl-3-(N-(pyridine-4-carbonyl)hydrazino)propanamide
- CAS Number: 51-12-7
- PubChem CID: 4472
- DrugBank: DB04820
- ChemSpider: 4317
- UNII: T2Q0RYM725
- KEGG: D07337
- ChEBI: CHEBI:94510
- ChEMBL: ChEMBL1256841
- CompTox Dashboard (EPA): DTXSID1023362
- ECHA InfoCard: 100.000.073

Chemical and physical data
- Formula: C_{16}H_{18}N_{4}O_{2}
- Molar mass: 298.346 g·mol^{−1}
- 3D model (JSmol): Interactive image
- SMILES: O=C(NNCCC(=O)NCc1ccccc1)c2ccncc2
- InChI: InChI=1S/C16H18N4O2/c21-15(18-12-13-4-2-1-3-5-13)8-11-19-20-16(22)14-6-9-17-10-7-14/h1-7,9-10,19H,8,11-12H2,(H,18,21)(H,20,22); Key:NOIIUHRQUVNIDD-UHFFFAOYSA-N

Nialamide (Niamid, Niamide, Nuredal, Surgex) is a non-selective, irreversible monoamine oxidase inhibitor (MAOI) of the hydrazine class that was used as an antidepressant. It was withdrawn by Pfizer several decades ago due to the risk of hepatotoxicity.

Side effects include agitation and insomnia, less frequently dry mouth, dizziness, blurred vision, and hypomania, and rarely leukopenia and hepatitis. As with other MAOIs, a hypertensive crisis can be triggered by co-ingestion of tyramine. It is metabolized into isoniazid, an anti-tuberculosis agent, and so is contraindicated in patients with tuberculosis. The recommended dosage range is 75 to 200 mg per day, with maintenance doses as low as 12.5 mg every other day.

The antiatherogenic activity of nialamide was used to design pyridinolcarbamate.

== See also ==
- Hydrazine (antidepressant)
