= Monoamine oxidase inhibitor =

Type of medication

- Drug class
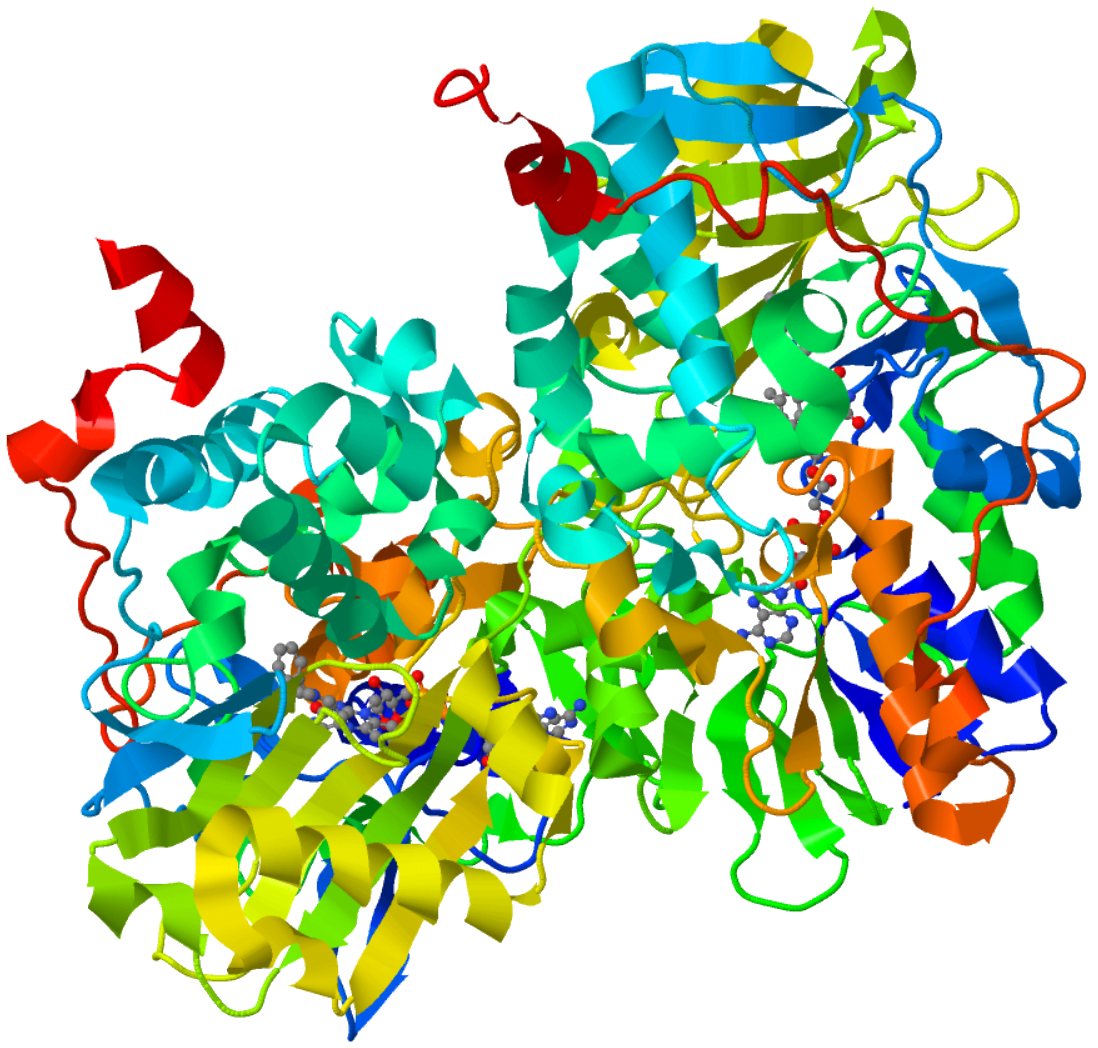
- Ribbon diagram of human monoamine oxidase B, from PDB: 1GOS

Class identifiers
- Synonyms: MAOI, RIMA
- Use: Treatment of major depressive disorder, atypical depression, Parkinson's disease, and several other disorders
- ATC code: N06AF
- Mechanism of action: Enzyme inhibitor
- Biological target: Monoamine oxidase enzymes: MAO-A and/or MAO-B

External links
- MeSH: D008996

Legal status

Monoamine oxidase inhibitors (MAOIs) are a class of drug that inhibit the activity of one or both monoamine oxidase enzymes: monoamine oxidase A (MAO-A) and monoamine oxidase B (MAO-B). MAOIs are effective antidepressants due to their specialized function of the inhibition of the enzyme that is responsible for neurotransmitter degradation in the synaptic cleft. This is especially true for treatment-resistant depression, which is a type of depression that is resistant to common treatments of typical depression, such as selective-serotonin reuptake inhibitors (SSRIs) or serotonin-norepinephrine reuptake inhibitors (SNRIs).

MAOIs are also used to treat panic disorder, social anxiety disorder, Parkinson's disease, and several other disorders.

Reversible inhibitors of monoamine oxidase A (RIMAs) are a subclass of MAOIs that selectively and reversibly inhibit the MAO-A enzyme. RIMAs are used clinically in the treatment of depression and dysthymia. Due to their reversibility, they are safer in single-drug overdose than the older, irreversible MAOIs, and weaker in increasing the monoamines important in depressive disorder. RIMAs have not gained widespread market share in the United States.

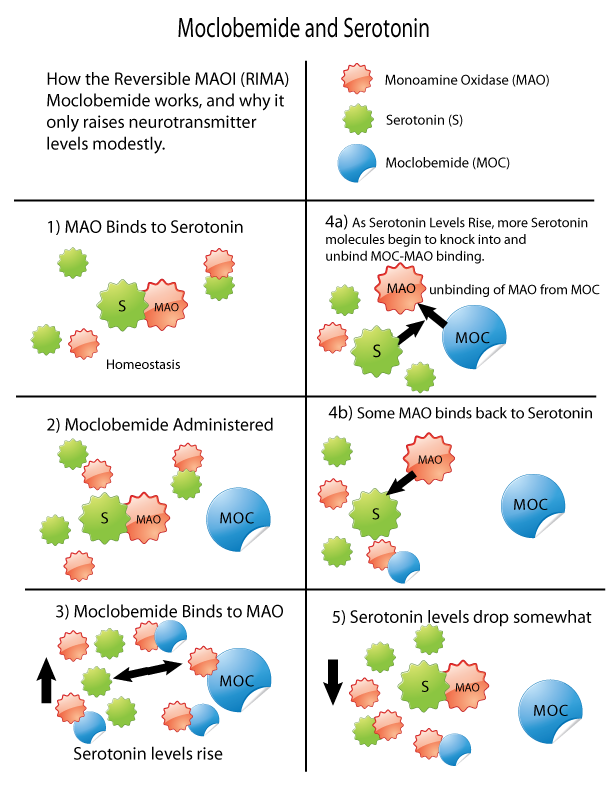
How RIMAs work and why RIMAs can only minimally increase depression-related neurotransmitters

== Medical uses ==
Skeletal formula of moclobemide, the prototypical RIMA.

MAOIs have been found to be effective in the treatment of panic disorder with agoraphobia, social phobia, atypical depression or mixed anxiety disorder and depression, bulimia, and post-traumatic stress disorder, as well as borderline personality disorder, and obsessive–compulsive disorder (OCD). MAOIs appear to be particularly effective in the management of bipolar depression according to a retrospective-analysis from 2009. There are reports of MAOI efficacy in OCD, trichotillomania, body dysmorphic disorder, and avoidant personality disorder, but these reports are from uncontrolled case reports.

MAOIs can also be used in the treatment of Parkinson's disease by targeting MAO-B in particular (therefore affecting dopaminergic neurons), as well as providing an alternative for migraine prophylaxis. Inhibition of both MAO-A and MAO-B is used in the treatment of clinical depression and anxiety.

MAOIs appear to be particularly indicated for outpatients with dysthymia complicated by panic disorder or hysteroid dysphoria.

Newer MAOIs such as selegiline (typically used in the treatment of Parkinson's disease) and the reversible MAOI moclobemide provide a safer alternative and are now sometimes used as first-line therapy.

Pargyline is a non-selective MAOI that was previously used as an antihypertensive agent to treat hypertension (high blood pressure).

== Side effects ==
=== Hypertensive crisis ===
People taking MAOIs generally need to change their diets to limit or avoid foods and beverages containing tyramine. If large amounts of tyramine are consumed, they may develop a hypertensive crisis, which can be fatal. Examples of foods and beverages with potentially high levels of tyramine include cheese, Chianti wine, and pickled fish. Excessive concentrations of tyramine in blood plasma can lead to hypertensive crisis by increasing the release of norepinephrine (NE), which causes blood vessels to constrict by activating alpha-1 adrenergic receptors. Ordinarily, MAO-A would destroy the excess NE; when MAO-A is inhibited, however, NE levels get too high, leading to dangerous increases in blood pressure.

RIMAs are displaced from MAO-A in the presence of tyramine, rather than inhibiting its breakdown in the liver as general MAOIs do. Additionally, MAO-B remains free and continues to metabolize tyramine in the stomach, although this is less significant than the liver action. Thus, RIMAs are unlikely to elicit tyramine-mediated hypertensive crisis; moreover, dietary modifications are not usually necessary when taking a reversible inhibitor of MAO-A (i.e., moclobemide) or low doses of selective MAO-B inhibitors (e.g., selegiline 6 mg/24 hours transdermal patch).

=== Drug interactions ===
Some of the highest-risk MAOI interactions involve drugs or supplements that substantially increase serotonin, especially drugs with significant serotonin reuptake inhibition or serotonin-releasing activity. Examples include SSRIs, SNRIs, clomipramine, imipramine, MDMA, meperidine, tramadol, methadone, tapentadol, and dextromethorphan, an over-the-counter cough suppressant. Other important interaction risks include agents that markedly increase catecholamine signaling or blood pressure, such as sympathomimetic decongestants including pseudoephedrine and ephedrine. Concomitant use of multiple MAOIs is generally contraindicated in prescribing guidance because of limited therapeutic rationale and limited safety literature, rather than because it is a proven serotonin-toxicity mechanism; this is distinct from MAOI-to-MAOI switching, where successful cross-tapering or abrupt switching has been reported but remains controversial and requires further research. Some dietary supplements can also be relevant, including serotonin precursors such as 5-HTP and products with monoamine oxidase-inhibiting or serotonin reuptake-inhibiting activity. Patients are often advised to inform clinicians and emergency personnel that they take an MAOI; some carry an MAOI-card listing medicines requiring avoidance or dose adjustment, including reduced adrenaline/epinephrine dosing in some circumstances.

For supplements that affect serotonin synthesis or signaling, risk varies by compound and dose. L-tryptophan is not categorically contraindicated with MAOIs; it has been used by experienced clinicians as an augmenting agent, although serotonin-mediated adverse effects such as hyperreflexia or clonus may occur, particularly at doses over 2 g.

MAOI drug interactions are assessed by mechanism rather than by broad drug class. Tricyclic antidepressants are not pharmacologically uniform in this interaction: clomipramine and imipramine are generally avoided because of significant serotonin reuptake inhibition, whereas other TCAs are considered compatible with MAOIs when selected appropriately, started at low doses, titrated gradually, and monitored. Other antidepressants, analgesics, stimulants, anesthetic agents, and supplements are not uniformly contraindicated; their risk depends on pharmacology, dose, route, and monitoring.

Stimulant and sympathomimetic interactions also vary by mechanism. Amphetamine preparations and indirect sympathomimetics can increase catecholamine release and may raise blood pressure, especially at higher doses. Lisdexamfetamine, an amphetamine prodrug, has been described in modern MAOI guidance as potentially safer than other amphetamine preparations because it produces lower peak plasma concentrations and a longer time to maximum concentration. Methylphenidate is pharmacologically distinct from amphetamines and has been used with MAOIs; reviews have reported no documented hypertensive crises or fatalities when stimulants were cautiously added to MAOIs.

Combinations with certain psychedelics like LSD or psilocybin appear to be relatively safe. On the other hand, MAOIs can strongly potentiate psychedelics metabolized by MAO like dimethyltryptamine (DMT), 5-MeO-DMT, and 2C-B, potentially resulting in serious toxicity or death. Findings for mescaline are less clear.

MAOIs also interact with tobacco-containing products (e.g. cigarettes) and may potentiate the effects of certain compounds in tobacco. This may be reflected in the difficulty of smoking cessation, as tobacco contains naturally occurring MAOI compounds in addition to the nicotine.

While tyramine-related dietary restrictions are less problematic than with classic nonselective irreversible MAOIs, RIMAs can still have significant drug interactions. Because MAO-A metabolizes serotonin, RIMAs can interact with drugs that substantially increase serotonergic activity.

Ocular alpha-2 agonists such as brimonidine and apraclonidine are glaucoma medications which reduce intraocular pressure by decreasing aqueous production. These alpha-2 agonists should not be given with oral MAOIs due to the risk of hypertensive crisis.

=== Withdrawal ===
Antidepressants including MAOIs have some dependence-producing effects, the most notable one being a discontinuation syndrome, which may be severe especially if MAOIs are discontinued abruptly or too rapidly. The dependence-producing potential of MAOIs or antidepressants in general is not as significant as benzodiazepines. Discontinuation symptoms can be managed by tapering, a gradual reduction in dosage over a period of days, weeks or sometimes months to minimize or prevent withdrawal symptoms.

MAOIs, as with most antidepressant medication, may not alter the course of the disorder in a significant, permanent way, so it is possible that discontinuation can return the patient to the pre-treatment state. This consideration complicates prescribing between an MAOI and an SSRI, because it is necessary to clear the system completely of one drug before starting another. One physician organization recommends the dose to be tapered down over a minimum of four weeks, followed by a two-week washout period. The result is that a depressed patient will have to bear the depression without chemical help during the drug-free interval. This may be preferable to risking the effects of an interaction between the two drugs.

== Mechanism of action ==
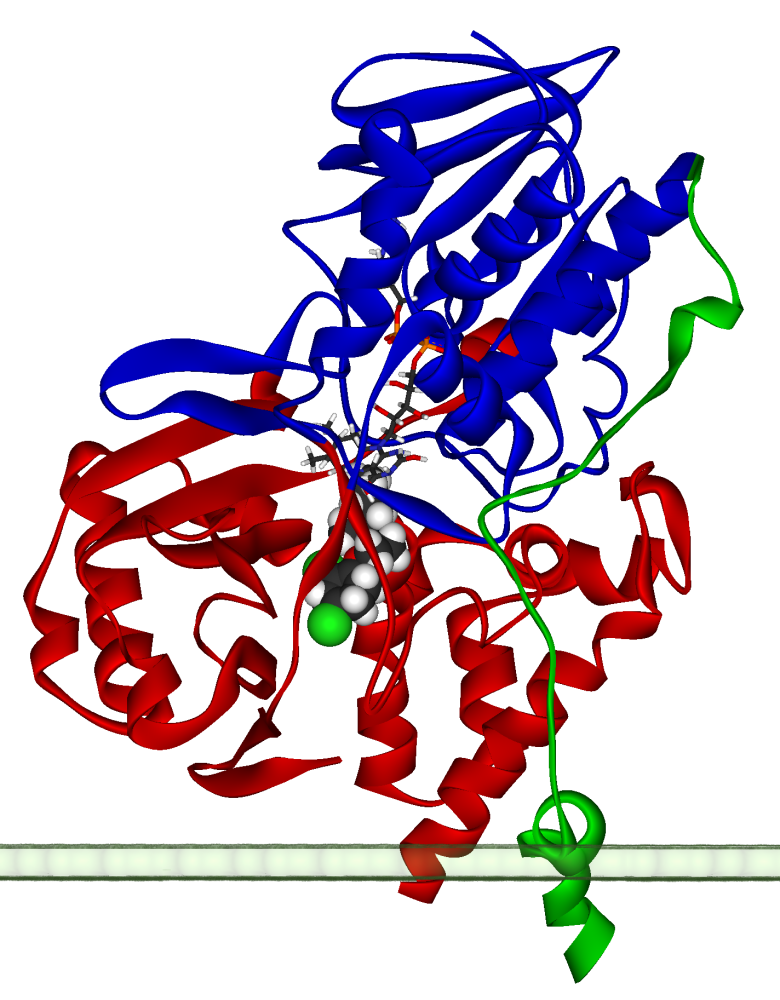
Ribbon diagram of a monomer of human MAO-A, with FAD and clorgiline bound, oriented as if attached to the outer membrane of a mitochondrion. From PDB: 2BXS.

MAOIs act by inhibiting the activity of monoamine oxidase. Monoamine oxidase is an enzyme that is responsible for the degradation of monoamine neurotransmitters, such as dopamine, serotonin, and norepinephrine, and prevents these neurotransmitters from remaining in the synaptic cleft for extended periods of time. Monoamine Oxidase Inhibitors are responsible for inhibiting monoamine oxidase, ultimately leading to prevention of the degradation of neurotransmitters in the synaptic cleft, leading to higher concentrations of neurotransmitters remaining in the synaptic cleft for longer periods of time.

There are two isoforms of monoamine oxidase, MAO-A and MAO-B. MAO-A preferentially deaminates serotonin, melatonin, epinephrine, and norepinephrine. MAO-B preferentially deaminates phenethylamine and certain other trace amines; in contrast, MAO-A preferentially deaminates other trace amines, like tyramine, whereas dopamine is equally deaminated by both types.

=== Reversibility ===
The early MAOIs covalently bound to the monoamine oxidase enzymes, thus inhibiting them irreversibly; the bound enzyme could not function and thus enzyme activity was blocked until the cell made new enzymes. The enzymes turn over approximately every two weeks. A few newer MAOIs, a notable one being moclobemide, are reversible, meaning that they are able to detach from the enzyme to facilitate usual catabolism of the substrate. The level of inhibition in this way is governed by the concentrations of the substrate and the MAOI.

Harmaline found in Peganum harmala, Banisteriopsis caapi, and Passiflora incarnata is a reversible inhibitor of monoamine oxidase A (RIMA).

=== Selectivity ===
In addition to reversibility, MAOIs differ by their selectivity of the MAO enzyme subtype. Some MAOIs inhibit both MAO-A and MAO-B equally, other MAOIs have been developed to target one over the other.

MAO-A inhibition reduces the breakdown of primarily serotonin, norepinephrine, and dopamine; selective inhibition of MAO-A allows for tyramine to be metabolised via MAO-B. Agents that act on serotonin, if taken with another serotonin-enhancing agent, may result in a potentially fatal interaction called serotonin syndrome; if taken with irreversible and unselective inhibitors (such as older MAOIs) a hypertensive crisis may result due to tyramine food interactions. Tyramine is broken down by MAO-A and MAO-B, therefore inhibiting this action may result in its excessive build-up, so diet must be monitored for tyramine intake.

MAO-B inhibition reduces the breakdown mainly of dopamine and phenethylamine, so there are no associated dietary restrictions. MAO-B would also metabolize tyramine, as the only differences between dopamine, phenethylamine, and tyramine are two phenylhydroxyl groups on carbons 3 and 4. The 4-OH would not be a steric hindrance to MAO-B on tyramine. Selegiline is selective for MAO-B at low doses, but non-selective at higher doses.

== History ==
The knowledge of MAOIs began with the serendipitous discovery that iproniazid was a potent MAO inhibitor (MAOI). Originally intended for the treatment of tuberculosis, in 1952, iproniazid's antidepressant properties were discovered when researchers noted that the depressed patients given iproniazid experienced a relief of their depression. Subsequent in vitro work led to the discovery that it inhibited MAO and eventually to the monoamine theory of depression. MAOIs became widely used as antidepressants in the early 1950s. The discovery of the 2 isoenzymes of MAO has led to the development of selective MAOIs that may have a more favorable side-effect profile.

The older MAOIs' heyday was mostly between the years 1957 and 1970. The initial popularity of the 'classic' non-selective irreversible MAO inhibitors began to wane due to their serious interactions with sympathomimetic drugs and tyramine-containing foods that could lead to dangerous hypertensive emergencies. As a result, the use by medical practitioners of these older MAOIs declined. When scientists discovered that there are two different MAO enzymes (MAO-A and MAO-B), they developed selective compounds for MAO-B, (for example, selegiline, which is used for Parkinson's disease), to reduce the side-effects and serious interactions. Further improvement occurred with the development of compounds (moclobemide and toloxatone) that not only are selective but cause reversible MAO-A inhibition and a reduction in dietary and drug interactions. Moclobemide, was the first reversible inhibitor of MAO-A to enter widespread clinical practice.

A transdermal patch form of the MAOI selegiline, called Emsam, was approved for use in depression by the Food and Drug Administration in the United States on 28 February 2006.

== List of MAO inhibiting drugs ==
=== Marketed MAOIs ===
- Nonselective MAO-A/MAO-B inhibitors
  - Hydrazine (antidepressant)
    - Isocarboxazid (Marplan)
    - Hydracarbazine
    - Phenelzine (Nardil, Nardelzine)
  - Non-hydrazines
    - Tranylcypromine (Parnate, Jatrosom)
- Selective MAO-A inhibitors
  - Bifemelane (Alnert, Celeport) (available in Japan)
  - Methylene blue (Urelene blue, Provayblue, Proveblue)
  - Moclobemide (Aurorix, Manerix, Moclamine)
  - Pirlindole (Pirazidol) (available in Russia)
- Selective MAO-B inhibitors
  - Rasagiline (Azilect)
  - Selegiline (Deprenyl, Eldepryl, Emsam, Zelapar)
  - Safinamide (Xadago)

Linezolid is an antibiotic drug with weak, reversible MAO-inhibiting activity.

The antibiotic furazolidone also has MAO-inhibiting activity

The Food and Drug Administration (FDA) has approved these MAOIs to treat depression:

- Isocarboxazid (Marplan)
- Phenelzine (Nardil)
- Selegiline (Emsam)
- Tranylcypromine (Parnate)

=== MAOIs that have been withdrawn from the market ===
- Nonselective MAO-A/MAO-B inhibitors
  - Hydrazines
    - Benmoxin (Nerusil, Neuralex)
    - Iproclozide (Sursum)
    - Iproniazid (Marsilid, Iprozid, Ipronid, Rivivol, Propilniazida)
    - Mebanazine (Actomol)
    - Nialamide (Niamid)
    - Octamoxin (Ximaol, Nimaol)
    - Pheniprazine (Catron)
    - Phenoxypropazine (Drazine)
    - Pivalylbenzhydrazine (Tersavid)
    - Safrazine (Safra) (discontinued worldwide except for Japan)
  - Non-hydrazines
    - Caroxazone (Surodil, Timostenil)
- Selective MAO-A inhibitors
  - Minaprine (Cantor)
  - Toloxatone (Humoryl)

=== List of RIMAs ===
Marketed pharmaceuticals

- Moclobemide (Aurorix, Manerix, Moclamine)

Other pharmaceuticals

- Brofaromine (Consonar)
- Caroxazone (Surodil, Timostenil)
- Eprobemide (Befol)
- Methylene blue
- Metralindole (Inkazan)
- Minaprine (Cantor)
- Pirlindole (Pirazidol)

Naturally occurring RIMAs in plants

Only reversible phytochemical MAOIs have been characterized.

- Harmaline
- Harmine
- Rosiridin (in vitro)
- Piperine (MAO-B Selective)

Research compounds

- Amiflamine (FLA-336)
- Befloxatone (MD-370,503)
- Cimoxatone (MD-780,515)
- Esuprone
- Sercloremine (CGP-4718-A)
- Tetrindole
- CX157 (TriRima)

== See also ==
- List of antidepressants
