= Concreteness training =

Repeated practice of cognitive skills to create habitual behaviors

Concreteness training (CNT) is the repeated practice of cognitive skills to create habitual behaviors in order to help reduce anxiety and depressive symptoms for those suffering from the disorder of depression. People suffering from depression have a tendency towards unhelpful abstract thinking and negative thoughts, such as viewing a single mistake as evidence that they are useless at everything. As such, CNT involves switching cognitive focus from negative thoughts to positive thoughts so as to cut down on rumination—focused attention on the symptoms of one's distress—and self-criticism, which can cause feelings of inadequacy and raise anxiety. However, there is evidence that CNT is limited in its effectiveness as a standalone therapy.

== Research ==
This technique was developed at the University of Exeter, located in Exeter, England, by Professor Edward Watkins and his team of researchers after they conducted a study to see if the CNT approach could reduce symptoms of depression and anxiety. In the 2009 study, twenty-one men and thirty-nine women were randomly assigned to one of three groups. The first group received CNT, the second group received bogus concreteness training (BGT), and the third group was a wait-list (WL) control condition that received no treatment. The concreteness training involved practicing thinking about the specific details of recent mild negative events: how the event happened, where it happened, who was there, what they did. The goal was to try to get a mental picture of the event, its circumstances, and then focus on the sequence of how it happened. Participants received the specific treatment every day for a week based on their assigned group. At the end of the week, participants were again assessed for depression levels and symptoms. Results indicated that CNT showed a trend toward a greater decrease in depressive symptoms than BGT or WL. Accordingly, Professor Watkins noted: “This is the first demonstration that just targeting thinking style can be an effective means of tackling depression. Concreteness training can be delivered with minimal face-to-face contact with a therapist and training could be accessed online, through CDs or through smartphone apps. This has the advantage of making it a relatively cheap form of treatment.”

In 2012, Professor Watkins followed up this research with a randomized control trial for treating major depression with guided self help concreteness training. 121 participants with diagnosed major depressive disorder were randomly placed into three condition groups. All three groups received treatment as usual with a general practitioner with the first group, the control group, only receiving treatment as usual while the second group paired treatment as usual with Concreteness Training and the third group paired treatment as usual with Relaxation Training. They found that both Concreteness Training and Relaxation Training were significantly more effective in reducing depressive symptoms in participants in comparison to the control, treatment as usual. This advantage over treatment as usual was maintained at the 3 month and 6 month follow ups. They concluded that guided self help Concreteness Training can be an efficacious treatment for mild depression. He notes that such treatment has the benefit of being low barrier, low cost and easy to implement in the context of primary care.

== Limitations ==
The overall effectiveness of Concreteness training as a stand alone treatment for treating is depression is thought to be limited. In a study published by Springer Nature in 2013 on CNT as a therapy alone, researchers did not find a significant effect on rumination; though, they did find the concreteness of thinking increased. The potential reasoning behind this lack of effect was "because the sample did not exhibit a significant decrease in depression". Yet, CNT has been proven to be effective when delivered in a specific manner, like therapeutic context, with the rationale that the participant knows he or she is being treated for depressive symptoms by a credible authority. Moreover, results have also demonstrated that CNT is a valid technique in the reduction of self-criticism, especially where the use of self-relevant events (autobiographical materials) has been prevalent.

== See also ==
- Cognitive psychology
- Management of depression
