= AYD =

AYD may refer to:

- American Youth for Democracy, youth section of the Communist Party USA from October 1943 until 1945
- Another Year of Disaster, second album by the Swedish band Adept
- AYD (airline), a Mexican low-cost chartered airline
- Anyang East railway station, China Railway pinyin code AYD

== See also ==
- Ayd
