= Gask (disambiguation) =

A gask is a student party in Sweden.

Gask may also refer to:

- Gask, Iran, a village in Sistan & Baluchestan Province
- Gask, Kerman, Iran, a village
- Gask Ridge, Roman fortifications in Scotland
- Gask Hill, Scotland
- Gask (surname)
