= Gask (surname) =

Gask is a surname. Notable people with the surname include:

- Arthur Gask (1869–1951), British novelist
- Lilian Gask (1865–1942), British author of children's books
- Linda Gask (fl. from 1980s), British psychiatrist and writer

== See also ==
- Gass (surname)
- Gast
- Rask (surname)
