= Management of depression =

Therapies, medications, and devices

Management of depression is the treatment of depression that may involve a number of different therapies: medications, behavior therapy, psychotherapy, and medical devices.

Depression is a symptom of some physical diseases; a side effect of some drugs and medical treatments; and a symptom of some mood disorders such as major depressive disorder or dysthymia. Physical causes are ruled out with a clinical assessment of depression that measures vitamins, minerals, electrolytes, and hormones.

Though psychiatric medication is the most frequently prescribed therapy for major depression, psychotherapy may be effective, either alone or in combination with medication. Given an accurate diagnosis of major depressive disorder, in general the type of treatment (psychotherapy or antidepressants, alternate or other treatments, or active intervention) is "less important than getting depressed patients involved in an active therapeutic program."

Psychotherapy is the treatment of choice in those under the age of 18, with medication offered only in conjunction with the former and generally not as a first line agent. The possibility of depression, substance misuse or other mental health problems in the parents should be considered and, if present and if it may help the child, the parent should be treated in parallel with the child.

== Psychotherapy and behavior therapy ==
There are a number of different psychotherapies for depression which are provided to individuals or groups by psychotherapists, psychiatrists, psychologists, clinical social workers, counselors or psychiatric nurses. With more chronic forms of depression, the most effective treatment is often considered to be a combination of medication and psychotherapy. Psychotherapy is the treatment of choice in people under 18. A meta-analysis examined the effectiveness of psychotherapy for depression across ages from younger than 13 years to older than 75 years. It summarizes results from 366 trials included 36,702 patients. It found that the best results were for young adults, with an average effect size of g=.98 (95% CI, 0.79–1.16). The effects were smallest for young children (<13 years), g = .35 (95% CI, 0.15–0.55), and second largest in the oldest group, g = .97 (95% CI, 0.42–1.52). The study was not able to compare the different types of therapy to each other. Most of the studies with children used therapies originally developed with adults, which may have reduced the effectiveness. The greater benefits with young adults might be due to a large number of studies including college students, who might have an easier time learning therapy skills and techniques. Most of the studies in children were done in the US, whereas in older age groups, more balanced numbers of studies came from Europe and other parts of the world as well.

As the most studied form of psychotherapy for depression, cognitive behavioral therapy (CBT) is thought to work by teaching clients to learn a set of cognitive and behavioral skills, which they can employ on their own. Earlier research suggested that cognitive behavioral therapy was not as effective as antidepressant medication in the treatment of depression; however, more recent research suggests that it can perform as well as antidepressants in treating patients with moderate to severe depression. Beck's treatment manual, Cognitive therapy of depression, has undergone the most research and accumulated the most evidence for its use. However, a number of other CBT manuals also have evidence to support their effectiveness with depression.

The effect of psychotherapy on patient and clinician rated improvement as well as on revision rates have declined steadily from the 1970s.

A systematic review of data comparing low-intensity CBT (such as guided self-help by means of written materials and limited professional support, and website-based interventions) with usual care found that patients who initially had more severe depression benefited from low-intensity interventions at least as much as less-depressed patients.

A smartphone application designed to treat depression using the principles of Cognitive Behavioral Therapy, named Rejoyn, was approved by the US FDA in 2024.

For the treatment of adolescent depression, one published study found that CBT without medication performed no better than a placebo, and significantly worse than the antidepressant fluoxetine. However, the same article reported that CBT and fluoxetine outperformed treatment with only fluoxetine. Combining fluoxetine with CBT appeared to bring no additional benefit in two different studies or, at the most, only marginal benefit, in a fourth study.

Behavior therapy for depression is sometimes referred to as behavioral activation. In addition, behavioral activation appears to take less time and lead to longer lasting change. Two well-researched treatment manuals include Social skills training for depression and Behavioral activation treatment for depression. A meta-analysis from 2023 showed that behavioral activation have a clinically meaningful effect on depression.

Emotionally focused therapy, founded by Sue Johnson and Les Greenberg in 1985, treats depression by identifying and processing underlying emotions. The treatment manual, Facilitating emotional change, outlines treatment techniques. This kind of therapy assumes that our emotions have a strong connection to our sense of identity. It believes that if we are able to foster and understand our emotions, our sense of identity will be healed as a result.

Acceptance and commitment therapy (ACT), a mindfulness form of CBT, which has its roots in behavior analysis, also demonstrates that it is effective in treating depression, and can be more helpful than traditional CBT, especially where depression is accompanied by anxiety and where it is resistant to traditional CBT.

A review of four studies on the effectiveness of mindfulness-based cognitive therapy (MBCT), a recently developed class-based program designed to prevent relapse, suggests that MBCT may have an additive effect when provided with the usual care in patients who have had three or more depressive episodes, although the usual care did not include antidepressant treatment or any psychotherapy, and the improvement observed may have reflected non-specific or placebo effects. Of note, although Mindfulness-based cognitive therapy for depression prevented relapse of future depressive episodes, there is no research on whether it can cause the remission of a current depressive episode.

Interpersonal psychotherapy (IPT) focuses on the social and interpersonal triggers that may cause depression. There is evidence that it is an effective treatment for depression. Here, the therapy takes a fairly structured course (often 12 sessions, as in the original research versions) as in the case with CBT; however, the focus is on relationships with others. Unlike family therapy, IPT is an individual format, so it is possible to work on interpersonal themes even if other family members do not come to the session. Therapy can be used to help a person develop or improve interpersonal skills in order to allow him or her to communicate more effectively and reduce stress. In a meta-analysis of 16 studies and 4,356 patients, the average improvement in depressive symptoms was an effect size of d = 0.63 (95% CI, 0.36 to 0.90). IPT combined with pharmacotherapy was more effective in preventing relapse than pharmacotherapy alone, number needed to treat = 7.63.

Couples therapy is sometimes recommended for people with depression. The goal of this therapy is to support the person with depression and emphasize the mutually supportive angle often associated with intimate partners and relationships, and provide mutual support for both partners and help manage any interpersonal changes in their relationship.

Psychoanalysis, a school of thought founded by Sigmund Freud that emphasizes the resolution of unconscious mental conflicts, is used by its practitioners to treat clients presenting with major depression. A more widely practiced technique, called psychodynamic psychotherapy, is loosely based on psychoanalysis and has an additional social and interpersonal focus. In a meta-analysis of three controlled trials, psychodynamic psychotherapy was found to be as effective as medication for mild to moderate depression.

=== Shared care ===
Shared decision making is an approach whereby patients and clinicians freely share important evidence when tasked with decision making and where patients are guided to consider the best available options to make an informed decision. The principles are well documented, but there is a gap in that it's hard to apply them in routine clinical practice. The steps have been simplified into five steps. The first step is seeking patient participation in that the health practitioner is tasked with communicating existing choices and therefore inviting them to the decision-making process. The next step involves assisting the patient to explore and compare the treatment options by a critical analysis of the risks and benefits. The third step involves the assessment of the patient's values and what they prefer taking to account what is of paramount urgency to the patient. Step 4 involves decision making where the patient and the practitioner make a conclusive decision on the best option and arrange for subsequent follow up meetings. Finally, the fifth step involves the analysis of the patient's decision'. Five steps for you and your patients to work together to make the best possible health care decisions. The step involves monitoring of the degree of implementation, overcoming of barriers of decision implantation consequently the decisions need to be revisited and optimized thus ensuring the decision has a positive impact on health outcomes. Its success relies on the ability of the health practitioner to create a good interpersonal relationship with the patient. (Stone, 2017)

Depression is a major problem globally, affecting an estimated 4.4 percent of the world population in 2017, roughly equivalent to 300 million people. The depression is multifactorial and has been on the increase due to societal pressure, genetic association and increase in use of drugs (Zhang et al. 2016). incorporation of nursing in management of depression may seem important in that nursing hold a pivotal role in health care delivery where they are they are the health practitioners that have been trained to be versatile from clinical to psychological care Their incorporation shared decision making in treating depression may be important as nurses are known to have the best interpersonal relationship with the patients thus a better collaborative model can be achieved due to this fact (Williams et al. 2016). With this in mind, the nurses may serve to administer drugs in management, prepare and maintain the patient's records, interaction with other care staff to achieve optimum care, and organizing therapy sessions (Lu et al. 2019).

Kathleen Walsh, 2017, recognizes that Dr. Velligan stated that SDM is of importance in demonstrating patient preferences in decision making when there is no clear approach to treatment. In addition, numerous tools can be used to make the decision making the process easier these include the Controlled Preferences Scale that informs clinicians on how to actively involve patients. She further gives the suggestion that providers need to embrace shared decision making by making sure the patients participate actively in their management thus enabling the success of the model.

== Medication ==
To find the most effective pharmaceutical drug treatment, the dosages of medications must often be adjusted, different combinations of antidepressants tried, or antidepressants changed. Some of the medications have side effects that affect certain people in different ways. The combinations of medication can change these side effects, so it is essential to monitor the changes that occur once we begin medication.

=== Serotonin modulator and stimulator ===
Vortioxetine is a multimodal antidepressant that can be more effective than some other antidepressants.

=== Selective serotonin reuptake inhibitors ===
Selective serotonin reuptake inhibitors (SSRIs), such as sertraline (Zoloft, Lustral), escitalopram (Lexapro, Cipralex), fluoxetine (Prozac), paroxetine (Seroxat), and citalopram, are the primary medications considered, due to their relatively mild side effects and broad effect on the symptoms of depression and anxiety, as well as reduced risk in overdose, compared to their older tricyclic alternatives. Those who do not respond to the first SSRI tried can be switched to another. If sexual dysfunction is present prior to the onset of depression, SSRIs should be avoided. Another popular option is to switch to the atypical antidepressant bupropion (Wellbutrin) or to add bupropion to the existing therapy; this strategy is possibly more effective. It is not uncommon for SSRIs to cause or worsen insomnia; the sedating noradrenergic and specific serotonergic antidepressant (NaSSA) antidepressant mirtazapine (Zispin, Remeron) can be used in such cases.

For children and adolescents with moderate-to-severe depressive disorder, fluoxetine seems to be the best treatment (either with or without cognitive behavioural therapy) but more research is needed to be certain. Sertraline, escitalopram, duloxetine might also help in reducing symptoms. In the UK fluoxetine and escitalopram are the only antidepressants recommended for people under the age of 18, though, if a child or adolescent patient is intolerant to fluoxetine, another SSRI may be considered.

Evidence of effectiveness of SSRIs in those with depression complicated by dementia is lacking.

=== Norepinephrine dopamine reuptake inhibitor ===
Some norepinephrine–dopamine reuptake inhibitors can be used as antidepressants.

=== Norepinephrine reuptake inhibitor ===
Norepinephrine reuptake inhibitors (NRIs) can be used as antidepressants.

=== Serotonin norepinephrine reuptake inhibitor ===
Venlafaxine (Effexor) from the SNRI class may be moderately more effective than SSRIs; however, it is not recommended as a first-line treatment because of the higher rate of side effects, and its use is specifically discouraged in children and adolescents.

=== Tricyclic antidepressant ===
Tricyclic antidepressants (TCAs) have a different side effect profile than SSRIs. In a study of inpatients the tricyclic antidepressant amitriptyline, in particular, appears to be more effective.

=== Monoamine oxidase inhibitor ===
Monoamine oxidase inhibitors, have historically been plagued by questionable efficacy (although early studies used dosages now considered too low) and life-threatening adverse effects. They are still used only rarely, although newer agents of this class (RIMA), with a better side effect profile, have been developed.

In older patients TCAs and SSRIs are of the same efficacy. However, there are differences between TCA related antidepressants and classical TCAs in terms of side effect profiles and withdrawal when compared to SSRIs.

There is evidence a prominent side-effect of antidepressants, emotional blunting, is confused with a symptom of depression itself. The cited study, according to Professor Linda Gask was:

'funded by a pharmaceutical company (Servier) and two of its authors are employees of that company', which may bias the results. The study authors' note: "emotional blunting is reported by nearly half of depressed patients on antidepressants and that it appears to be common to all monoaminergic antidepressants not only SSRIs". Additionally, they note: "The OQuESA scores are highly correlated with the HAD depression score; emotional blunting cannot be described simply as a side-effect of antidepressant, but also as a symptom of depression. More emotional blunting is associated with a poorer quality of remission.

=== NMDA antagonists ===
==== Ketamine ====
Research on the antidepressant effects of ketamine infusions at subanaesthetic doses has consistently shown rapid (4 to 72 hours) responses from single doses, with substantial improvement in mood in the majority of patients and remission in some. However, these effects are often short-lived, and attempts to prolong the antidepressant effect with repeated doses and extended ("maintenance") treatment have resulted in only modest success. A nasal spray formulation of esketamine, sold under the brand name Spravato, gained FDA approval in 2019 for the treatment of treatment-resistant depression when combined with an oral antidepressant.

Evidence-based meta-analyses support treatment protocols that differ substantially from standard real-world clinical practice: an optimized dose of 0.71 mg/kg rather than the conventional 0.5 mg/kg, intravenous infusion rather than intranasal delivery, and a racemic formulation rather than esketamine alone.

==== Dextromethorphan ====
Dextromethorphan/bupropion, sold under the brand name Auvelity, is a combination medication approved by the US FDA in 2022 for the treatment of major depressive disorder (MDD) in adults. The formulation pairs dextromethorphan, an N-methyl-D-aspartate (NMDA) receptor antagonist and sigma-1 receptor agonist, with bupropion, a norepinephrine-dopamine reuptake inhibitor that also functions as a CYP2D6 enzyme inhibitor. Bupropion is included in the combination to slow the metabolism of dextromethorphan by inhibiting CYP2D6, thereby increasing its bioavailability and allowing dextromethorphan's potential antidepressant effects to be achieved. While the precise mechanism of action in treating depression is not fully understood, it is hypothesized that the medication works by modulating glutamate signaling and influencing other neurotransmitter systems.

=== Zinc ===
A 2012 cross-sectional study found an association between zinc deficiency and depressive symptoms among women, but not men, and a 2013 meta-analysis of 17 observational studies found that blood zinc concentrations were lower in depressed subjects than in control subjects. A 2012 meta-analysis found that zinc supplementation as an adjunct to antidepressant drug treatment significantly lowered depressive symptom scores of depressed patients. The potential mechanisms underlying the association between low serum zinc and depression remain unclear, but may involve the regulation of neurotransmitter, endocrine and neurogenesis pathways. Zinc supplementation has been reported to improve symptoms of ADHD and depression. A 2013 review found that zinc supplementation may be an effective treatment in major depression.

=== Acetyl-l-carnitine ===
Acetylcarnitine levels were lower in depressed patients than controls and in rats it causes rapid antidepressant effects through epigenetic mechanisms. A systematic review and meta-analysis of 12 randomized controlled trials found "supplementation significantly decreases depressive symptoms compared with placebo/no intervention, while offering a comparable effect with that of established antidepressant agents with fewer adverse effects."

=== Augmentation ===
Physicians often add a medication with a different mode of action to bolster the effect of an antidepressant in cases of treatment resistance; a 2002 large community study of 244,859 depressed Veterans Administration patients found that 22% had received a second agent, most commonly a second antidepressant. Stephen M. Stahl, renowned academician in psychopharmacology, has stated resorting to a dynamic psychostimulant, in particular, d-amphetamine is the "classical augmentation strategy for treatment-refractory depression". However, the use of stimulants in cases of treatment-resistant depression is relatively controversial.

It is also possible to use a benzodiazepine as to improve sleep without impairing the antidepressant response specially in patients presenting symptoms of insomnia and disturbed sleep. A randomized controlled trial found that the use of eszopiclone with fluoxetine resulted in a better remission rate.

Addition of atypical antipsychotics when the patient has not responded to an antidepressant is also known to increase the effectiveness of antidepressant drugs, albeit at the cost of more frequent and potentially serious side effects.

==== Lithium ====
Lithium has been used to augment antidepressant therapy in those who have failed to respond to antidepressants alone. As an augmentation agent for major depression, lithium is much more effective than placebo. Lithium augmentation has proven efficacy in treating major depressive disorder in multiple randomized controlled trials.

For treatment-resistant depression, lithium augmentation reduces the odds of remaining ill by 56-95%. In the STAR-D study, for patients who had not achieved remission with two previous treatment trials, an additional 15.9% achieved remission. A disadvantage of lithium versus other augmentation agents is the need for occasional blood tests to monitor lithium levels.

Lithium dramatically decreases the suicide risk in recurrent major depression by 88.5%. In addition to its effects on suicide, lithium also decreases mortality from all causes in people with mood disorders.

==== Thyroid hormones ====
There is some evidence for the addition of a thyroid hormone, triiodothyronine, in patients with normal thyroid function.

For TRD patients, T_{3} has been studied in the STAR-D study with having a remission rate of 24.7%. T_{4} is also being studied for this purpose and found remission rates of 21.5%–64.7% for TRD patients.

==== Regulatory status, efficacy and tolerability of adjunctive treatments in depression ====
Drug	MHRA approved as an adjunct?	TGA approved as an adjunct?	FDA approved as an adjunct?	OR for non-response over antidepressant monotherapy	Mean difference for MADRS	Mean difference for HAM-D	OR for leaving the study early due to any reason	OR for leaving the study early due to adverse effects	OR for significant weight gain	Mean difference for weight gain (kg)	OR for sedation
Aripiprazole	No	No	Yes	0.48 (0.37–0.63)	−3.04 (−4.09,0.00)	ND	1.21 (0.86, 1.71)	2.59 (1.18, 5.71)	5.93 (2.15, 16.36)	1.07 (0.30, 1.84)	3.42 (0.66, 17.81)
Lithium	No	No. But listed in the Australian Medicines Handbook as an accepted use of lithium treatment.	No	0.47 (0.27-0.81)	No data	No data	No data	No data	No data	No data	No data
Olanzapine	No	No	Yes (in combination with fluoxetine)	0.70 (0.48, 1.02)	−2.84 (−5.84,−0.20)	−7.90 (−16.63, 0.83)	1.22 (0.82, 1.83)	3.51 (1.58, 7.80)	12.14 (0.70, 208.95)	4.58 (4.06, 5.09)	3.53 (1.64, 7.60)
Quetiapine	Yes	Yes	Yes	0.66 (0.51, 0.87)	−2.67 (−4.00, −1.34)	−2.67 (−3.79, −1.55)	0.75 (0.26, 2.14)	5.59 (1.47, 21.26)	3.06 (1.22, 7.68)	1.11 (0.56, 1.66)	8.79 (4.90, 15.77)
Risperidone	No	No	No	0.57 (0.36, 0.89)	−1.85 (−9.17, 5.47)	−1.69 (−4.13, 0.74)	1.04 (0.59, 1.83)	2.11 (0.79, 5.68)	3.32 (0.99, 11.12)	1.80 (0.95, 2.65)	1.10 (0.31, 3.99)

=== Efficacy of medication and psychotherapy ===
Antidepressants are statistically superior to placebo but their overall effect is low-to-moderate. In that respect they often did not exceed the National Institute for Health and Clinical Excellence criteria for a "clinically significant" effect. In particular, the effect size was very small for moderate depression but increased with severity, reaching "clinical significance" for very severe depression. These results were consistent with the earlier clinical studies in which only patients with severe depression benefited from either psychotherapy or treatment with an antidepressant, imipramine, more than from the placebo treatment. Despite obtaining similar results, the authors argued about their interpretation. One author concluded that there "seems little evidence to support the prescription of antidepressant medication to any but the most severely depressed patients, unless alternative treatments have failed to provide benefit." The other author agreed that "antidepressant 'glass' is far from full" but disagreed "that it is completely empty". He pointed out that the first-line alternative to medication is psychotherapy, which does not have superior efficacy.

Antidepressants in general are as effective as psychotherapy for major depression, and this conclusion holds true for both severe and mild forms of MDD. In contrast, medication gives better results for dysthymia. The subgroup of SSRIs may be slightly more efficacious than psychotherapy. On the other hand, significantly more patients drop off from the antidepressant treatment than from psychotherapy, likely because of the side effects of antidepressants. Successful psychotherapy appears to prevent the recurrence of depression even after it has been terminated or replaced by occasional "booster" sessions. The same degree of prevention can be achieved by continuing antidepressant treatment.

Two studies suggest that the combination of psychotherapy and medication is the most effective way to treat depression in adolescents. Both TADS (Treatment of Adolescents with Depression Study) and TORDIA (Treatment of Resistant Depression in Adolescents) showed very similar results. TADS resulted in 71% of their teen subjects having "much" or "very much" improvement in mood over the 61% with medication alone and 43% with CBT alone. Similarly, TORDIA showed a 55% improvement with CBT and drugs versus a 41% with drug therapy alone. However, a more recent meta-analysis of 34 trials of 14 drugs used with children and adolescents found that only fluoxetine produced significant benefit compared to placebo, with a medium-sized effect (standardize mean difference = .5).

==== Treatment resistance ====
The risk factors for treatment resistant depression are: the duration of the episode of depression, severity of the episode, if bipolar, lack of improvement in symptoms within the first couple of treatment weeks, anxious or avoidant and borderline comorbidity and old age. Treatment resistant depression is best handled with a combination of conventional antidepressant together with atypical antipsychotics. Another approach is to try different antidepressants. It's inconclusive which approach is superior. Treatment resistant depression can be misdiagnosed if subtherapeutic doses of antidepressants is the case, patient nonadherence, intolerable adverse effects or their thyroid disease or other conditions is misdiagnosed as depression.

=== Experimental treatments ===
==== Ayahuasca ====
Research into ayahuasca has been recommended, given there is limited early evidence of potential antidepressant and anxiolytic effects.

==== Bretisilocin ====
In March 2026, bretisilocin entered European Medicines Agency's priority medicines (PRIME) scheme for major depressive disorder, while a phase 2 clinical trial was still ongoing.

==== Chromium ====
Clinical and experimental studies have reported antidepressant activity of chromium particularly in atypical depression, characterized by increased appetite and carbohydrate craving.

==== Creatine ====
The amino acid creatine, commonly used as a supplement to improve the performance of bodybuilders, has been studied for its potential antidepressant properties. A review found that creatine "has the potential to improve these disruptions [of brain metabolism] in some patients, and early clinical trials indicate that it may have efficacy as an antidepressant agent." Studies on mice have found that the antidepressant effects of creatine can be blocked by dopamine receptor antagonists such as haloperidol, suggesting that the drug acts on dopamine pathways.

==== Inositol ====
Inositol, a sugar alcohol in fruits, beans, grains and nuts, was found to be significantly better than placebo in treating depression in a double-blind, controlled trial. It was also reported to be reduced in human CSF in depression and found to lead to "major improvement" in 9 of 11 depressed patients in an open label trial.

==== Magnesium ====
A meta-analysis has found an association between magnesium intake and depression. Magnesium was lower in serum of depressed patients than controls.

A 2018 review found that Mg^{2+} supplementation (range 225–4000 mg) and number of weeks of treatment (range 1–12) were not related to changes in mood disorder.

==== Essential fatty acids ====
There is insufficient evidence to determine that omega-3 fatty acid has any effect on depression. A 2016 review found that if trials with formulations containing mostly eicosapentaenoic acid (EPA) are separated from trials using formulations containing docosahexaenoic acid (DHA), it appeared that EPA may have an effect while DHA may not, but there was insufficient evidence to be sure.

A 2020 meta-analysis showed that a high dose of omega-3 polyunsaturated fatty acid (>2 g/day) used as an adjuvent improved depressive symptoms.

==== Dopamine receptor agonist ====
Some research suggests dopamine receptor agonists, most commonly pramipexole, may be effective in treating depression. Studies are few and results are preliminary, however.

==== N-Acetylcysteine ====
A systematic review and meta-analysis of 5 studies found that N-acetylcysteine reduces depressive symptoms more than placebo and has good tolerability. N-acetylecysteine may exert its benefits by replenishing the chief cellular antioxidant, glutathione, thus modulating glutamatergic, neurotropic and inflammatory pathways.

==== Psilocybin ====
Psilocybin has been shown in several studies to improve symptoms in people with treatment-resistant depression. In 2018 and 2019, the FDA designated psilocybin as a "breakthrough therapy" for drug-resistant depression and major depressive disorder.

==== St John's wort ====
A 2008 Cochrane Collaboration meta-analysis concluded that "The available evidence suggests that the hypericum extracts tested in the included trials a) are superior to placebo in patients with major depression; b) are similarly effective as standard antidepressants; c) and have fewer side effects than standard antidepressants. The association of country of origin and precision with effects sizes complicates the interpretation." The United States National Center for Complementary and Integrative Health advice is that "St. John's wort may help some types of depression, similar to treatment with standard prescription antidepressants, but the evidence is not definitive." and warns that "Combining St. John's wort with certain antidepressants can lead to a potentially life-threatening increase of serotonin, a brain chemical targeted by antidepressants. St. John's wort can also limit the effectiveness of many prescription medicines."

==== Rhodiola rosea ====
A 2011 review reported Rhodiola rosea "is an adaptogen plant that can be especially helpful in treating asthenic or lethargic depression, and may be combined with conventional antidepressants to alleviate some of their common side effects."

==== Saffron ====
A 2013 meta-analysis found that saffron supplementation significantly reduced depression symptoms compared to placebo, and both saffron supplementation and the antidepressant groups were similarly effective in reducing depression symptoms. A 2015 meta-analysis supported the "efficacy of saffron as compared to placebo in improving the following conditions: depressive symptoms (compared to anti-depressants and placebo), premenstrual symptoms, and sexual dysfunction. In addition, saffron use was also effective in reducing excessive snacking behavior." Therapeutic doses of saffron exhibits no significant toxicity in both clinical and experimental investigations.

==== SAMe ====
S-Adenosyl methionine (SAMe) is available as a prescription antidepressant in Europe and an over-the-counter dietary supplement in the US. Evidence from 16 clinical trials with a small number of subjects, reviewed in 1994 and 1996 suggested it to be more effective than placebo and as effective as standard antidepressant medication for the treatment of major depression.

==== Tryptophan and 5-HTP ====
The amino acid tryptophan is converted into 5-hydroxytryptophan (5-HTP) which is subsequently converted into the neurotransmitter serotonin. Since serotonin deficiency has been recognized as a possible cause of depression, it has been suggested that consumption of tryptophan or 5-HTP may therefore improve depression symptoms by increasing the level of serotonin in the brain. 5-HTP and tryptophan are sold over the counter in North America, but requires a prescription in Europe. The use of 5-HTP instead of tryptophan bypasses the conversion of tryptophan into 5-HTP by the enzyme tryptophan hydroxylase, which is the rate-limiting step in the synthesis of serotonin, and 5-HTP easily crosses the blood–brain barrier unlike tryptophan, which requires a transporter.

Small studies have been performed using 5-HTP and tryptophan as adjunctive therapy in addition to standard treatment for depression. While some studies had positive results, they were criticized for having methodological flaws, and a more recent study did not find sustained benefit from their use. The safety of these medications has not been well studied. Due to the lack of high quality studies, preliminary nature of studies showing effectiveness, the lack of adequate study on their safety, and reports of eosinophilia–myalgia syndrome from contaminated tryptophan in 1989 and 1990, the use of tryptophan and 5-HTP is not highly recommended or thought to be clinically useful.

== Medical devices ==
A variety of medical devices are in use or under consideration for treatment of depression including devices that offer electroconvulsive therapy, vagus nerve stimulation, repetitive transcranial magnetic stimulation, and cranial electrotherapy stimulation. The use of such devices in the United States requires approval by the U.S. Food and Drug Administration (FDA) after field trials. In 2010 an FDA advisory panel considered the question of how such field trials should be managed. Factors considered were whether drugs had been effective, how many different drugs had been tried, and what tolerance for suicides should be in field trials.

=== Electroconvulsive therapy ===
In 2004, a meta-analytic review paper found in terms of efficacy, "a significant superiority of ECT in all comparisons: ECT versus simulated ECT, ECT versus placebo, ECT versus antidepressants in general, ECT versus tricyclics and ECT versus monoamine oxidase inhibitors."

Electroconvulsive therapy (ECT) is a standard psychiatric treatment in which seizures are electrically induced in patients to provide relief from psychiatric illnesses. ECT is used with informed consent as a last line of intervention for major depressive disorder. Among the elderly, who often experience depression, the efficacy of ECT is difficult to determine due to the lack of trials comparing ECT to other treatments.

A round of ECT is effective for about 50% of people with treatment-resistant major depressive disorder, whether it is unipolar or bipolar. Follow-up treatment is still poorly studied, but about half of people who respond relapse with twelve months.

Aside from effects in the brain, the general physical risks of ECT are similar to those of brief general anesthesia. Immediately following treatment, the most common adverse effects are confusion and memory loss. ECT is considered one of the least harmful treatment options available for severely depressed pregnant women.

A usual course of ECT involves multiple administrations, typically given two or three times per week until the patient no longer has symptoms ECT is administered under anesthetic with a muscle relaxant. Electroconvulsive therapy can differ in its application in three ways: electrode placement, frequency of treatments, and the electrical waveform of the stimulus. These three forms of application have significant differences in both adverse side effects and symptom remission. After treatment, drug therapy is usually continued, and some patients receive maintenance ECT.

ECT appears to work in the short term via an anticonvulsant effect mostly in the frontal lobes, and longer term via neurotrophic effects primarily in the medial temporal lobe.

=== Deep brain stimulation ===
The support for the use of deep brain stimulation in treatment-resistant depression comes from a handful of case studies, and this treatment is still in a very early investigational stage. In this technique electrodes are implanted in a specific region of the brain, which is then continuously stimulated. A March 2010 systematic review found that "about half the patients did show dramatic improvement" and that adverse events were "generally trivial" given the younger psychiatric patient population than with movements disorders. Deep brain stimulation is available on an experimental basis only in the United States; no systems are approved by the FDA for this use.

=== Repetitive transcranial magnetic stimulation ===
Transcranial magnetic stimulation (TMS) or deep transcranial magnetic stimulation is a noninvasive method used to stimulate small regions of the brain. During a TMS procedure, a magnetic field generator, or "coil" is placed near the head of the person receiving the treatment. The coil produces small electric currents in the region of the brain just under the coil via electromagnetic induction. The coil is connected to a pulse generator, or stimulator, that delivers electric current to the coil.

TMS was approved by the FDA for treatment-resistant major depressive disorder in 2008 and as of 2014 clinical evidence supports this use. The American Psychiatric Association, the Canadian Network for Mood and Anxiety Disorders, and the Royal Australia and New Zealand College of Psychiatrists have endorsed rTMS for trMDD.

The response rate is about 29% for TRD patients. Remission rate is about 20%.

=== Vagus nerve stimulation ===
Vagus nerve stimulation (VNS) uses an implanted electrode and generator to deliver electrical pulses to the vagus nerve, one of the primary nerves emanating from the brain. It is an approved therapy for treatment-resistant depression in the EU and US and is sometimes used as an adjunct to existing antidepressant treatment. The support for this method comes mainly from open-label trials, which indicate that several months may be required to see a benefit. The only large double-blind trial conducted lasted only 10 weeks and yielded inconclusive results; VNS failed to show superiority over a sham treatment on the primary efficacy outcome, but the results were more favorable for one of the secondary outcomes. The authors concluded "This study did not yield definitive evidence of short-term efficacy for adjunctive VNS in treatment-resistant depression."

=== Cranial electrotherapy stimulation ===
A 2014 Cochrane review found insufficient evidence to determine whether or not Cranial electrotherapy stimulation with alternating current is safe and effective for treating depression.

=== Transcranial direct current stimulation ===
A 2016 meta-analysis of transcranial direct current stimulation (tDCS) reported some efficacy of tDCS in the treatment of acute depressive disorder with moderate effect size, and low efficacy in treatment-resistant depression, and that use of 2 mA current strength over 20 minutes per day over a short time span can be considered safe.

== Other treatments ==
=== Bright light therapy ===
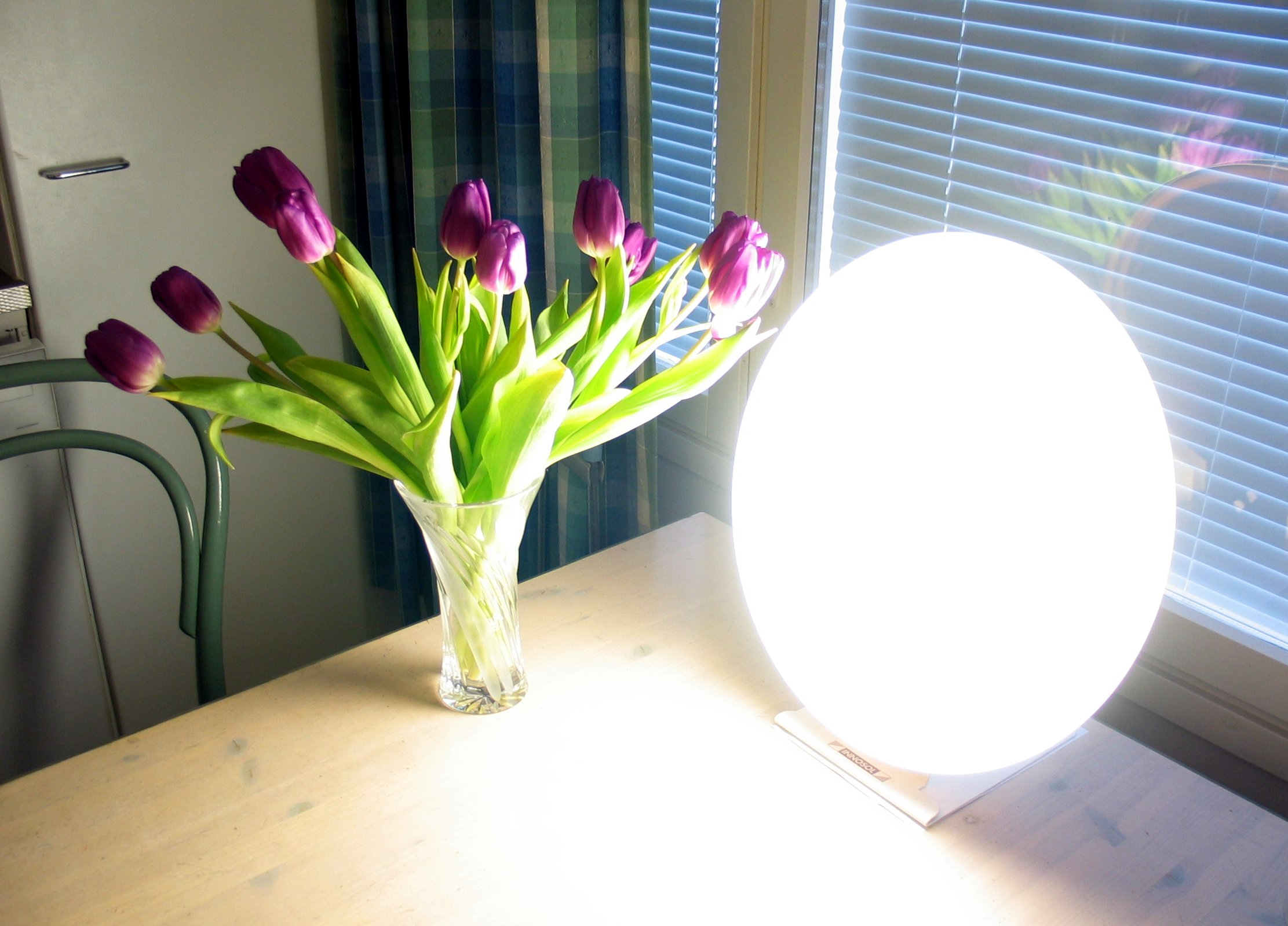
Bright light therapy is sometimes used to treat depression, especially in its seasonal form.

A meta-analysis of bright light therapy commissioned by the American Psychiatric Association found a significant reduction in depression symptom severity associated with bright light treatment. Benefit was found for both seasonal affective disorder and for nonseasonal depression, with effect sizes similar to those for conventional antidepressants. For non-seasonal depression, adding light therapy to the standard antidepressant treatment was not effective. A meta-analysis of light therapy for non-seasonal depression conducted by Cochrane Collaboration, studied a different set of trials, where light was used mostly in combination with antidepressants or wake therapy. A moderate statistically significant effect of light therapy was found, with response significantly better than control treatment in high-quality studies, in studies that applied morning light treatment, and with patients who respond to total or partial sleep deprivation. Both analyses noted poor quality of most studies and their small size, and urged caution in the interpretation of their results. The short 1–2 weeks duration of most trials makes it unclear whether the effect of light therapy could be sustained in the longer term.

=== Exercise ===
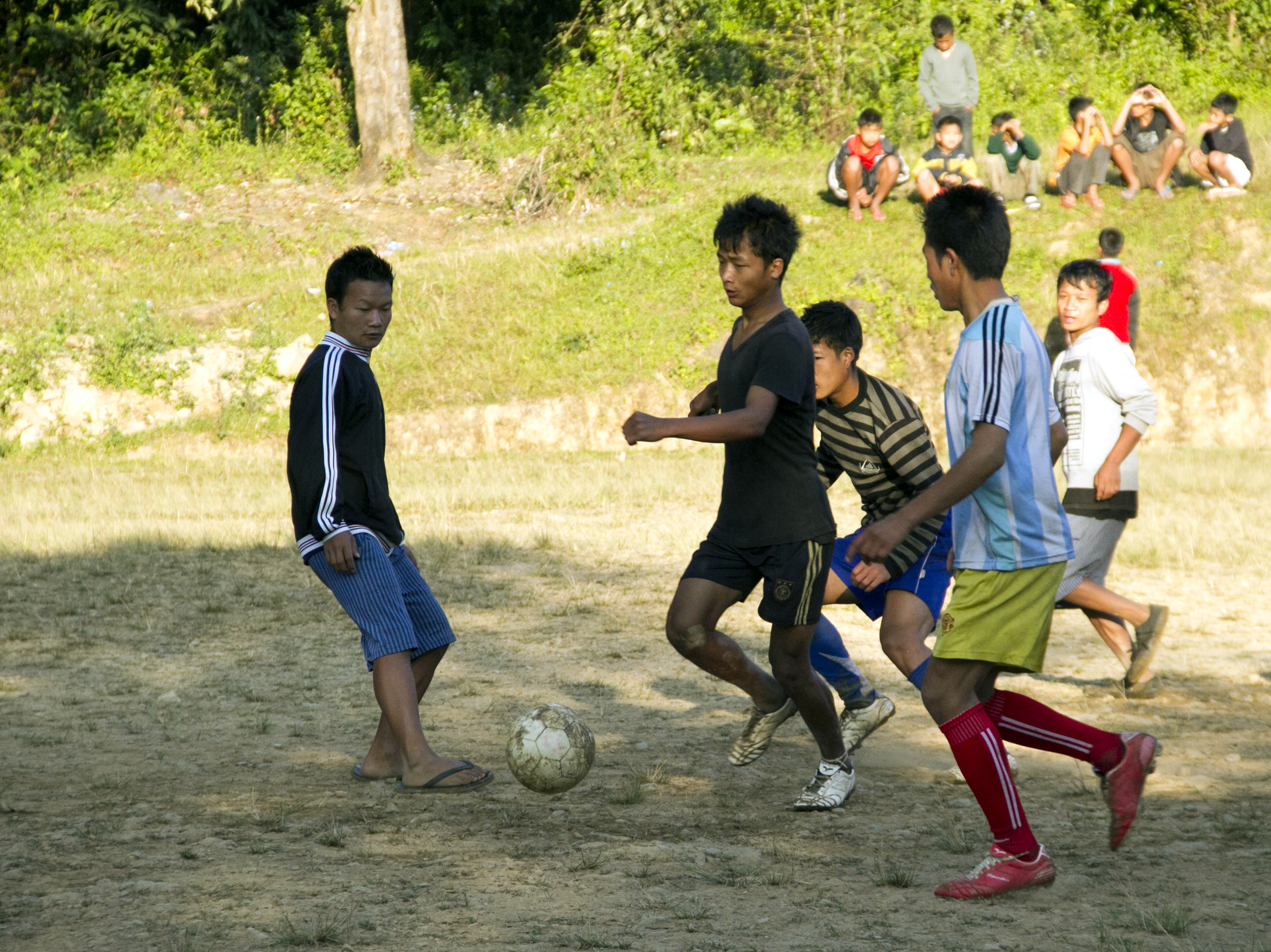
Physical exercise is one recommended way to manage mild depression, such as by playing soccer.

The 2013 Cochrane Collaboration review (updated in 2026) on physical exercise for depression noted that, based upon limited evidence, it is moderately more effective than a control intervention and comparable to psychological or antidepressant drug therapies. Smaller effects were seen in more methodologically rigorous studies. Three subsequent 2014 systematic reviews that included the Cochrane review in their analysis concluded with similar findings: one indicated that physical exercise is effective as an adjunct treatment with antidepressant medication; the other two indicated that physical exercise has marked antidepressant effects and recommended the inclusion of physical activity as an adjunct treatment for mild–moderate depression and mental illness in general. These studies also found smaller effect sizes in more methodologically rigorous studies. All four systematic reviews called for more research in order to determine the efficacy or optimal exercise intensity, duration, and modality.

A 2025 systematic review on the effectiveness of rock climbing for depression reported that indoor bouldering combined with mindfulness exercises may be an effective, clinically meaningful, safe, and sustainable adjunctive intervention for adults with moderate depression. However, the review found insufficient data to determine whether it was superior to other established treatments.

The evidence for brain-derived neurotrophic factor (BDNF) in mediating some of the neurobiological effects of physical exercise was noted in one review which hypothesized that increased BDNF signaling is responsible for the antidepressant effect.

A meta-analysis of 15 studies published in 2022 suggested a curvilinear dose-response relationship between exercise and depression risk, with low levels of exercise showing the best dose-response.

=== Meditation ===
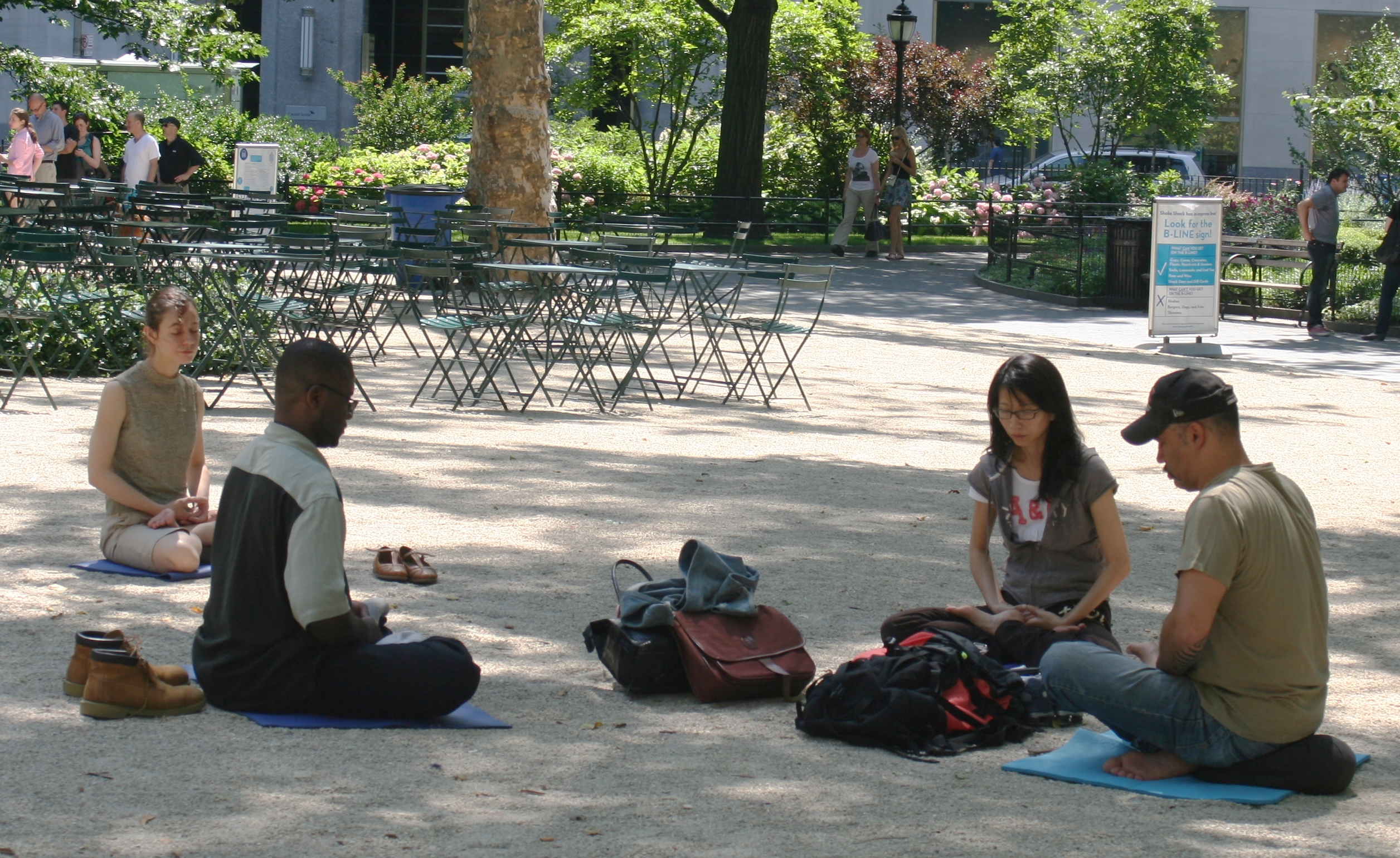
People meditating in Madison Square Park in New York City

Mindfulness meditation programs may help improve symptoms of depression, but they are no better than active treatments such as medication, exercise, and other behavioral therapies.

=== Music therapy ===
A 2009 review found that 3 to 10 sessions of music therapy (when added to standard care) resulted in a noticeable improvement in depressive symptoms, with still greater improvement after 16 to 51 sessions.

A 2017 cochrane systematic review found that music therapy added to the usual treatment of depression gives better outcome than the usual treatment alone: "The effect size translates to a difference of 9.8 points on the HAM-D". It also found that there is no significant difference between active and receptive music therapy comparing depression outcome. It is also important to note that music therapy is not associated with more or fewer adverse events than treatment as usual.

=== Occupational therapy ===
Occupational therapy (OT) is a healthcare profession that involves the use of assessment and intervention to develop, recover, or maintain the meaningful activities, or occupations, of individuals, groups, or communities. It is an independent health profession sometimes categorized as an allied health profession and consists of occupational therapists (OTs) and occupational therapy assistants (OTAs). A person with depression may experience interruptions in sleep, difficulty completing self-care tasks, decreased motivation to participate in leisure activities, decreased concentration for school or job related work, and avoidance of social interactions. Occupational therapy practitioners possess the educational knowledge base in mental health and can contribute to the efforts in mental health promotion, prevention, and intervention.

Winston Churchill is a famous example of someone who treated his depression by occupying himself with work and other productive activities. Out of office, Churchill was prone to depression (his "black dog") as he sensed his political talents being wasted and time passing him by – in all such times, writing provided the antidote.

=== Sleep ===
Depression is sometimes associated with insomnia (difficulty in falling asleep, early waking, or waking in the middle of the night). The combination of these two results, depression and insomnia, will only worsen the situation. Hence, good sleep hygiene is important to help break this vicious circle. It would include measures such as regular sleep routines, avoidance of stimulants such as caffeine and management of sleeping disorders such as sleep apnea.

=== Smoking cessation ===
Quitting smoking cigarettes is associated with reduced depression and anxiety, with the effect "equal or larger than" those of antidepressant treatments.

=== Total/partial sleep deprivation ===
Sleep deprivation (skipping a night's sleep) has been found to improve symptoms of depression in 40–60% of patients. Partial sleep deprivation in the second half of the night may be as effective as an all night sleep deprivation session. Improvement may last for weeks, though the majority (50–80%) relapse after recovery sleep. Shifting or reduction of sleep time, light therapy, antidepressant drugs, and lithium have been found to potentially stabilize sleep deprivation treatment effects.

=== Shared care ===
Shared care, when primary and specialty physicians have joint management of an individual's health care, has been shown to alleviate depression outcomes.

== Research ==
Trials are investigating whether botulinum toxin, when used to make a person appear to frown less, stops negative feedback from the face and affects depression.

Psilocybin may have a beneficial role in the treatment of depression.

A 2019 meta-analysis found that hypnotherapy may be an effective way of alleviating the symptoms of depression.

No model of depression in animals that fully explains the mechanism of depression has been found as of 2019.

== See also ==
- Rapid-acting antidepressant
- STAR*D
