= Antidepressants in Japan =

The number of new psychiatric drugs, and especially antidepressants on the market in Japan, is significantly less than Western countries.

One of the biggest barriers to antidepressants coming to the market is that the medical insurance system in Japan is national, and the authorities are keen to contain a potentially explosive market for drugs like antidepressants that, from the Japanese perspective, could be used or abused by persons in various forms of distress.

Although large epidemiological studies have not been done in Japan, it is thought that up to 6 million Japanese have depression, with a lifetime prevalence of 13 to 17.3%, which is similar to that seen in Western countries.

== Market ==
While the market has seen the entry of selective serotonin reuptake inhibitors (SSRIs) fluvoxamine, paroxetine, sertraline, and escitalopram; others such as citalopram and fluoxetine are either pending approval or no longer being considered.

Prior to year 2000 and possibly even later, clinical developments did not use placebo controlled trials; instead they have pitted candidate drugs against those currently approved for that indication using a "non-inferiority" method of comparison. This method is known to be subject to placebo effects (e.g. depressive symptoms lifting due to effects other than pharmacologic drug effect.) According to a Japanese medical report in 2002, Trazodone and tricyclic antidepressants (TCAs) were widely available in Japan while only two SSRIs (paroxetine and fluvoxamine) were marketed.

Fluvoxamine was the first SSRI to be approved in Japan (1999). Sertraline received approval in April 2006, having been pending approval for over 15 years.

Currently (as of 2017) the three most sold antidepressants in Japan are duloxetine, mirtazapine, and escitalopram (Lexapro).

The three most sold antidepressants by the end of 2010 were paroxetine with a value market share of 37%, sertraline with a share of 20% and fluvoxamine with a share of 15%.

The Japan algorithm for mood disorders does not include many of the post-tricyclic antidepressants used as first-line antidepressants in Western countries for almost two decades, and recent studies are still comparing SSRIs and tricyclic antidepressants, even though tricyclics are 2nd or 3rd line treatments in the West. Organon International and Meiji Seika have filed an application for approval of mirtazapine in Japan, a drug on the market in many Western countries since 1994. Meiji Seika is commercializing mirtazapine (brand name Reflex) in Japan which was approved for depression in 2009.

SNRI Duloxetine (Cymbalta - Shionogi and Eli Lilly Japan) was first approved in Japan in 2010 for major depressive disorder. In the following years it gained approval for diabetic neuropathy pain, fibromyalgia, chronic low back pain and osteoarthritis.

Citalopram (Lundbeck), an SSRI on the market since the late 1980s is not available in Japan; however on April 22, 2011 escitalopram (the S-isomer enantiomer of citalopram), was approved for use. There is little news, however, on the status of bupropion (Glaxo Smith-Kline), used widely in Western countries since the early 1990s and long in clinical trials in Japan.

Takeda and Lundbeck submitted vortioxetine (Trintellix) to the Ministry of Health, Labour and Welfare in Japan. If approved it may be commercialized in 2019.
