= Carbinoxamine/pseudoephedrine =

Antihistamine and decongestant combination

Combination of
- Carbinoxamine: antihistamine
- Pseudoephedrine: decongestant

Clinical data
- Trade names: Rondec, Ceron, Coldec

Identifiers
- CAS Number: 3505-38-2

Carbinoxamine/pseudoephedrine is an antihistamine and decongestant combination, marketed as Rondec, Ceron and Coldec. It contains two active ingredients: carbinoxamine and pseudoephedrine.
