= Tiazesim =

Discontinued antidepressant medication

Clinical data
- Trade names: Altinil
- Other names: Thiazesim; Thiazenone; SQ-10496
- Routes of administration: By mouth
- ATC code: None

Legal status
- Legal status: In general: ℞ (Prescription only)

Identifiers
- IUPAC name: 5-[2-(dimethylamino)ethyl]-2-phenyl-2,3-dihydro-1,5-benzothiazepin-4(5H)-one
- CAS Number: 5845-26-1 3122-01-8 (hydrochloride)
- PubChem CID: 22107
- ChemSpider: 20775
- UNII: 44G76ZB85O
- KEGG: D02699
- ChEMBL: ChEMBL2111123
- CompTox Dashboard (EPA): DTXSID30863620

Chemical and physical data
- Formula: C_{19}H_{22}N_{2}OS
- Molar mass: 326.46 g·mol^{−1}
- 3D model (JSmol): Interactive image
- SMILES: CN(C)CCN1C(=O)CC(SC2=CC=CC=C21)C3=CC=CC=C3
- InChI: InChI=1S/C19H22N2OS/c1-20(2)12-13-21-16-10-6-7-11-17(16)23-18(14-19(21)22)15-8-4-3-5-9-15/h3-11,18H,12-14H2,1-2H3; Key:QJJXOEFWXSQISU-UHFFFAOYSA-N

Tiazesim (INN), or thiazesim (BAN, USAN), previously sold under the brand name Altinil, is a heterocyclic antidepressant related to the tricyclic antidepressants (TCAs) which, introduced in 1966 by Squibb Corporation (now Bristol-Myers Squibb), has since been discontinued and is no longer marketed.

== See also ==
- Diltiazem
- Tofenacin
