= Linda Gask =

British psychiatrist and writer

- Education: University of Edinburgh
- Known for: The Other Side of Silence (2015); Out of Her Mind: How We Are Failing Women's Mental Health and What Must Change (2024)
- Awards: Royal College of Psychiatrists President’s Medal (2017)
- Scientific career
- Fields: Psychiatry
- Workplaces: University of Manchester; NHS

Linda Gask is a British psychiatrist and writer. She is Emerita Professor of Primary Care Psychiatry at the University of Manchester. She is an advisor to the World Health Organization and been awarded the President’s Medal by the Royal College of Psychiatrists in 2017. She was also a Commonwealth Fund 2000-2001 Harkness Fellow in Health Care Policy and Practice based in Seattle. Previously, she worked as a consultant for the NHS, and an academic at the University of Manchester. After retiring, she returned for a year to work with the Greater Manchester Bereavement Service.

Gask has written two memoirs that discuss her experience of anxiety and depression.

== Early life and education ==
Gask was born in England, where she was brought up in a working-class household. Growing up, Gask's brother had severe obsessive compulsive disorder, her mother (Paula, a factory worker) had chronic anxiety, and her father (Raymond, who worked in an amusement park in Skegness, and who died shortly after Gask qualified as a doctor) had what she believes were periods of depression and social phobia.

Gask decided she wanted to train in Medicine aged 15, and trained at University of Edinburgh. She was the first in her family to go to university.

Gask describes having struggled with anxiety before her A-Levels, and then self-medicating with alcohol at university. She saw a counsellor for a few sessions at university, but didn't find it helpful. When she could no longer manage, she received support from a psychiatrist who gave her medication and support at the university health centre, which enabled her to complete her training.

Gask struggled to get a training post when she finished her degree, and felt herself drawn to psychiatry.

Gask descirbes herself as having been a feminist since the 80s.

== Writing ==
Gask has written a range of academic work and memoir. In 2004, she published A Short Introduction to Psychiatry, which provides an introduction to the profession from both the practitioner and patient/user's perspective.

=== The Other Side of Silence: A Psychiatrist's Memoir of Depression (2015) ===
Gask's first memoir was The Other Side of Silence: A Psychiatrist's Memoir of Depression, published in 2015. Drawing on her own experiences of anxiety and depression and training as a psychiatrist, the book describes the way that mental health professionals also struggle with their mental health. Gask uses clinical vignettes and descriptions of her own experiences to describe depression.

The book is divided into themes, including vulnerability, fear, taking tablets, trust, and loneliness. She discusses treatment for depression including anti-depressant medication and cognitive behavioural therapy (CBT).

=== Finding True North: The Healing Power of Place (2021) ===
In 2021, Gask published a book titled Finding True North: The Healing Power of Place, a memoir proposing the healing power of place and Gask's experiences of anxiety and depression.

=== Out of Her Mind: How We Are Failing Women's Mental Health and What Must Change (2024) ===
On 10 October 2024 (Women's Mental Health Day), Gask published Out of Her Mind: How We Are Failing Women's Mental Health and What Must Change on Cambridge University Press. The book explores the "social and systemic failures in addressing women’s mental health. Drawing on over 3 decades of clinical and academic experience, Gask weaves together personal anecdotes, historical critique, feminist scholarship, and real women’s stories to expose the biases and inequities in mental health care that continue to harm women." The book aims to walk the complex line where "Women can be both depressed and oppressed; there is no contradiction or mutual exclusivity here."

Gask discusses women's mental health across a life-course, from adolescence, premenstrual dysphoric disorder, eating disorders in teenage and adulthood, postpartum suicide, mental health in the menopause, to the impact of the burden of caregiving in older age. She also discusses the impact of social media on younger women's mental health. Gask incorporates discussion of social dynamics, hormonal and physiological factors that she proposes all influence women's mental health.

Gask also discusses borderline personality disorder, claiming that "it is inherently misogynist… It certainly pathologises a way that women behave in extremis when they are powerless and traumatized".

Gask's book also incorporates a range of references from literature and politics including Charlotte Perkins Gilman's The Yellow Wallpaper, Sylvia Plath's The Bell Jar, Maya Angelou’s I Know Why the Caged Bird Sings, Susie Orbach’s Fat is a Feminist Issue, Betty Friedan’s The Feminine Mystique, as well as the writings of bell hooks and Kimberlé Crenshaw.

== Personal life ==
Gask was previously married to a research scientist. She subsequently remarried.

She was diagnosed with inherited kidney disease shortly after retiring.

She lives in Orkney, where she is the vice-chair of the Orkney Blide Trust.

Gask has criticised the UK's cuts to Department for Work and Pensions (DWP) sickness benefits in the UK in 2025, which she argue unfairly impact women. Gask has also been highly critical of the diagnosis of Borderline Personality Disorder (or Emotionally Unstable Personality Disorder) which is primarily diagnosed in women, proposing that the diagnosis should be disposed of.

== Books ==
- A Short Introduction to Psychiatry, Sage, 2004. ISBN 978-0-7619-7139-9
- Finding True North: The Healing Power of Place, Sandstone Press Ltd, 2022. ISBN 978-1-913207-34-2
- The Other Side of Silence: A Psychiatrist's Memoir of Depression, Summersdale, 2015. ISBN 978-1-84953-754-4
- Out of Her Mind: How We Are Failing Women's Mental Health and What Must Change, Cambridge University Press, 2024. ISBN 978-1-009-38246-5

=== Co-Authored ===
- Jenkins, R., Lewis, B., Goldberg, D. P. WHO Guide to Mental Health in Primary Care, Royal Society of Medicine Press, 2000. ISBN 978-1-85315-451-5
- Daines, B. Gask, L., Howe, A. Medical and Psychiatric Issues for Counsellors, Sage, 2007. ISBN 978-1-4129-2399-6
- Goldberg, D., Gask, L., Morriss, R. Psychiatry in Medical Practice, Routledge, 2008. ISBN 978-0-415-42544-5

=== Edited ===
- Gask, L., Lester, H., Kendrick, T., Peveler, R. (eds), Primary Care Mental Health, RCPsych Publications, 2009. ISBN 978-1-911623-03-8
- Gask, L., Coskun, Bulent, C., Baron, D. A. (eds), Teaching Psychiatry: Putting Theory into Practice, Wiley, 2010. ISBN 978-0-470-68321-7
- Gask, L., Chew-Graham, C. A. (eds), ABC of Anxiety and Depression, Wiley, 2014. ISBN 978-1-118-78079-4
