= Active placebo =

An active placebo is a placebo that produces noticeable side effects that may convince the person being treated that they are receiving a legitimate treatment, rather than an inert placebo.

== Nomenclature ==
According to a 1965 paper, the term "concealed placebo" (German: Kaschiertes Placebo) was suggested in a 1959 paper published in German.

== Example ==
An example of an active placebo is the 1964 work of Shader and colleagues who used a combination of low-dose phenobarbital plus atropine to mimic the sedation and dry mouth produced by phenothiazines.

Morphine and gabapentin are painkillers with the common side effects of sleepiness and dizziness. In a 2005 study assessing the effects of these painkillers on neuropathic pain, lorazepam was chosen as an active placebo because it is not a painkiller but it does cause sleepiness and can cause dizziness.

Testing from the late 1950s onwards on narcotic analgesics like morphine also has used dicyclomine as an active placebo, and on some occasions it was reported to cause the Straub mouse tail reaction, as do most narcotics. Clonidine is now finding more use as an active placebo for narcotics.
