= Gregory Oxenkrug =

Neuropsychopharmacology Research and Developments

Gregory F. Oxenkrug is a Russian-American neuropsychopharmacologist, psychiatrist, and academic researcher known for his contributions to the study of serotonin, melatonin, and the kynurenine pathway of tryptophan metabolism in psychiatric and age-related disorders. He has been affiliated with the Department of Psychiatry at Tufts University School of Medicine and Tufts Medical Center, where he served as a professor of psychiatry. His research has focused on the interactions among inflammation, metabolism, aging, and neuropsychiatric disease.

== Early life and education ==
Oxenkrug received his medical and scientific training in the former Soviet Union, graduating from Pavlov First Saint Petersburg State Medical University (formerly the First Leningrad Medical Institute) in 1965. He subsequently conducted research in Leningrad (now Saint Petersburg), where he collaborated with neuropharmacologist Izyaslav Lapin on studies investigating the role of serotonin in depression and antidepressant mechanisms.

== Career ==
In the late 1960s, Oxenkrug and Lapin proposed that enhancement of central serotonergic activity was an important mechanism underlying the antidepressant effects of several medications, contributing to early formulations of the serotonin hypothesis of depression. Their work helped establish serotonin as a central focus of biological psychiatry research.

Oxenkrug immigrated to the United States in 1980 and joined Boston University School of Medicine as an associate professor of psychiatry. In 1982, he moved to Wayne State University School of Medicine, where he served as associate professor of psychiatry and chief of the Adult Psychiatry Inpatient Service.

He later joined Tufts University, where he established research programs examining the relationships between inflammation, stress, aging, and psychiatric disorders. He became associated with the Psychiatry and Inflammation Program at Tufts Medical Center and remained active in research into the 2020s. In 2025, Tufts awarded him emeritus status.

== Research ==
Oxenkrug is best known for his work on the Kynurenine pathway, the primary metabolic route through which tryptophan is converted into biologically active compounds. His research proposed that inflammatory activation of this pathway contributes to depression, schizophrenia, metabolic syndrome, diabetes, cognitive decline, and age-related disorders. His studies have explored:

- The relationship between inflammation and depression
- The role of tryptophan metabolism in psychiatric disorders
- Interactions between metabolic syndrome and neuropsychiatric disease
- The effects of melatonin and serotonin on aging processes
- Biomarkers linking immune activation to mental illness

Oxenkrug has also investigated interferon-induced depression, proposing that activation of indoleamine 2,3-dioxygenase (IDO) may explain depressive symptoms associated with immune therapies.

== Publications and scientific impact ==
Oxenkrug has authored more than 100 scientific publications in neuropsychopharmacology, psychiatry, and molecular neuroscience. His work has been widely cited in studies examining the links among inflammation, metabolism, and mental health disorders.

Among his influential publications are reviews on the serotonin–kynurenine hypothesis of depression and investigations into the role of kynurenine metabolites in diabetes, aging, and schizophrenia.

== Selected works ==
- Serotonin–Kynurenine Hypothesis of Depression: Historical Overview and Recent Developments (2013)
- Metabolic Syndrome, Age-Associated Neuroendocrine Disorders, and Dysregulation of Tryptophan–Kynurenine Metabolism (2010)
- Anthranilic Acid, a GPR109A Agonist, and Schizophrenia (2024)

== Legacy ==
Oxenkrug's work has contributed to contemporary understanding of the interplay between immune function, metabolism, and psychiatric illness. His research helped expand neuropsychopharmacology beyond classical neurotransmitter models by emphasizing inflammatory and metabolic pathways as contributors to mental disorders and aging-related diseases.
