= Rask (surname) =

Family name

Rask is a surname which may refer to:

== Politics ==
- Maija Rask (born 1951), Finnish politician
- Märt Rask (born 1950), Estonian attorney, jurist, and politician
- Ola Rask (born 1940), Swedish politician
- Samuel A. Rask (1874–1959), American businessman and politician

== Sport ==
=== Association football ===
- Caroline Rask (born 1994), Danish footballer
- Jesper Rask (born 1988), Danish footballer
- Mikkel Rask (born 1983), Danish footballer
- Svend Aage Rask (1935–2020), Danish footballer

=== Ice hockey ===
- Fanny Rask (born 1991), Swedish ice hockey player
- Joonas Rask (born 1990), Finnish ice hockey player
- Tuukka Rask (born 1987), Finnish ice hockey player
- Victor Rask (born 1993), Swedish ice hockey player

=== Other sports ===
- Bengt Rask (born 1928), Swedish swimmer
- Erik Rask (born 1936), Danish rower
- Joakim Rask (born 1972), Swedish golfer
- Kaarto Rask (1928–2001), Finnish shot putter

== Other ==
- Gertrud Rask (1673–1735), Norwegian missionary to Greenland
- Grethe Rask (1930–1977), Danish physician and surgeon who became one of the first non-Africans to die due to AIDS
- Helene Rask (born 1980), Norwegian model
- Karin Rask (born 1979), Estonian actress
- Rasmus Rask (1787–1832), Danish scholar and philologist
