= Tofenacin =

SNRI antidepressant medication

Clinical data
- Trade names: Elamol, Tofacine, Tofalin
- Other names: tofenacin hydrochloride (USAN US)
- Routes of administration: By mouth
- ATC code: None

Legal status
- Legal status: In general: ℞ (Prescription only)

Identifiers
- IUPAC name: N-methyl-2-[(2-methylphenyl)(phenyl)methoxy]ethanamine
- CAS Number: 15301-93-6 10488-36-5 (HCl)
- PubChem CID: 25315
- ChemSpider: 23647
- UNII: C4A112M10H
- CompTox Dashboard (EPA): DTXSID50864578
- ECHA InfoCard: 100.035.746

Chemical and physical data
- Formula: C_{17}H_{21}NO
- Molar mass: 255.361 g·mol^{−1}
- 3D model (JSmol): Interactive image
- SMILES: O(CCNC)C(c1ccccc1)c2ccccc2C
- InChI: InChI=1S/C17H21NO/c1-14-8-6-7-11-16(14)17(19-13-12-18-2)15-9-4-3-5-10-15/h3-11,17-18H,12-13H2,1-2H3; Key:PNYKGCPSFKLFKA-UHFFFAOYSA-N

Tofenacin is an antidepressant drug with a tricyclic-like structure which was developed and marketed in the United Kingdom and Italy in 1971 and 1981, respectively, by Brocades-Stheeman & Pharmacia (now part of Astellas Pharma). It acts as a serotonin-norepinephrine reuptake inhibitor, and based on its close relation to orphenadrine, may also possess anticholinergic and antihistamine properties. Tofenacin is also the major active metabolite of orphenadrine and likely plays a role in its beneficial effects against depressive symptoms seen in Parkinson's disease patients.

== See also ==
- Clemastine
- Orphenadrine
- Tiazesim
