= Frank Ayd =

American psychiatrist

Portrait of Frank Ayd

Frank Joseph Ayd Jr. (October 14, 1920 – March 21, 2008) was an American psychiatrist known for introducing the first antipsychotic medications into US clinical practice, being granted the first permit from the Food and Drug Administration to use Thorazine for schizophrenia. He took part in writing more than 50 books and authored over 400 articles. The “Ayd’s Lexicon of Psychiatry, Neurology and the Neurosciences” became a standard reference.

According to The New York Times, he was a chief pioneer in the field of psychopharmacology.

Born in Baltimore on October 14, 1920, in the family of a pediatrician, he graduated from Loyola College in Baltimore and the University of Maryland School of Medicine. His work began in pediatrics but soon he was called to active duty by the Navy and assigned to surgery at Bethesda Naval Hospital. Shortly afterwards he moved to the Veterans Hospital in Perry Point, Maryland and became a psychiatrist. Although initially having no interest in psychiatry, he changed his view and practiced it for the rest of his life, introducing many pharmaceutical agents. Frank Ayd studied, in his words, "practically speaking, every neuroleptic that ever got on the market in this country except for Clozaril and Risperdal".

== Books ==
- Recognizing the Depressed Patient, with Essentials; F. Ayd; Published by Grune & Stratton, Inc. 1961
