= List of Rhodiola species =

The following is a list of all 76 species in the plant genus Rhodiola which are accepted by Plants of the World Online as of 27 October 2026.

- Rhodiola algida (Ledeb.) Fisch. & C.A.Mey.
- Rhodiola alsia (Fröd.) S.H.Fu
- Rhodiola amabilis (H.Ohba) H.Ohba
- Rhodiola angusta Nakai
- Rhodiola atsaensis (Fröd.) H.Ohba
- Rhodiola atuntsuensis (Praeger) S.H.Fu
- Rhodiola borealis Boriss.
- Rhodiola bouffordii H.Ohba
- Rhodiola bupleuroides (Wall. ex Hook.f. & Thomson) S.H.Fu
- Rhodiola calliantha (H.Ohba) H.Ohba
- Rhodiola chrysanthemifolia (H.Lév.) S.H.Fu
- Rhodiola coccinea (Royle) Boriss.
- Rhodiola crenulata (Hook.f. & Thomson) H.Ohba
- Rhodiola cretinii (Raym.-Hamet) H.Ohba
- Rhodiola daochengensis J.Q.Zhang & G.Y.Rao
- Rhodiola discolor (Franch.) S.H.Fu
- Rhodiola dumulosa (Franch.) S.H.Fu
- Rhodiola fastigiata (Hook.f. & Thomson) S.H.Fu
- Rhodiola feiyongii H.Ohba, S.Akiyama & S.K.Wu
- Rhodiola forrestii (Raym.-Hamet) S.H.Fu
- Rhodiola fushuhsiae H.Ohba, S.Akiyama & S.K.Wu
- Rhodiola gelida Schrenk ex Fisch. & C.A.Mey.
- Rhodiola handelii H.Ohba
- Rhodiola heterodonta (Hook.f. & Thomson) Boriss.
- Rhodiola himalensis (D.Don) S.H.Fu
- Rhodiola hobsonii (Prain ex Raym.-Hamet) S.H.Fu
- Rhodiola hookeri S.H.Fu
- Rhodiola humilis (Hook.f. & Thomson) S.H.Fu
- Rhodiola imbricata Edgew.
- Rhodiola integrifolia Raf.
- Rhodiola ishidae (Miyabe & Kudô) H.Hara
- Rhodiola junggarica Chang Y.Yang & N.R.Cui
- Rhodiola kaschgarica Boriss.
- Rhodiola kirilowii (Regel) Maxim.
- Rhodiola kunlunica H.Ohba, S.Akiyama & S.K.Wu
- Rhodiola liciae (Raym.-Hamet) S.H.Fu
- Rhodiola litvinovii Boriss.
- Rhodiola lobulata (N.B.Singh & U.C.Bhattach.) H.Ohba
- Rhodiola ludlowii H.Ohba
- Rhodiola macrocarpa (Praeger) S.H.Fu
- Rhodiola marginata Grierson
- Rhodiola multibracteata H.Chuang
- Rhodiola namlingensis S.Y.Meng
- Rhodiola nepalica (H.Ohba) H.Ohba
- Rhodiola nobilis (Franch.) S.H.Fu
- Rhodiola pachyclados (Aitch. ex Hemsl.) H.Ohba
- Rhodiola pamiroalaica Boriss.
- Rhodiola pauciflora (Edgew.) Pusalkar
- Rhodiola prainii (Raym.-Hamet) H.Ohba
- Rhodiola primuloides (Franch.) S.H.Fu
- Rhodiola purpureoviridis (Praeger) S.H.Fu
- Rhodiola quadrifida (Pall.) Fisch. & C.A.Mey.
- Rhodiola recticaulis Boriss.
- Rhodiola rhodantha (A.Gray) H.Jacobsen
- Rhodiola rosea L.
- Rhodiola sachalinensis Boriss.
- Rhodiola saxicola H.Ohba, S.Akiyama & S.K.Wu
- Rhodiola saxifragoides (Fröd.) H.Ohba
- Rhodiola sedoides Lidén & Bharali
- Rhodiola semenovii (Regel & Herder) Boriss.
- Rhodiola serrata H.Ohba
- Rhodiola sherriffii H.Ohba
- Rhodiola sinuata (Royle ex Edgew.) S.H.Fu
- Rhodiola smithii (Raym.-Hamet) S.H.Fu
- Rhodiola stapfii (Raym.-Hamet) S.H.Fu
- Rhodiola stephani (Cham.) Trautv. & C.A.Mey.
- Rhodiola subopposita (Maxim.) H.Jacobsen
- Rhodiola tangutica (Maxim.) S.H.Fu
- Rhodiola tibetica (Hook.f. & Thomson) S.H.Fu
- Rhodiola tricarpa S.Y.Meng & G.Y.Rao
- Rhodiola wallichiana (Hook.) S.H.Fu
- Rhodiola wangii S.Y.Meng
- Rhodiola wenchuanensis T.Li & Hao Zhang
- Rhodiola yunnanensis (Franch.) S.H.Fu
- Rhodiola yushuensis S.Y.Meng & Jun Zhang
