= C20H28O10 =

The molecular formula C_{20}H_{28}O_{10} (molar mass: 428.43 g/mol, exact mass: 428.1682 u) may refer to:

- Rosarin
- Rosavin
