= Agynykatty tract =

Coordinates: 45°27′06″N 80°31′50″E

The Agynykatty tract is located in the Almaty Region of Kazakhstan. The Agynykatty River washed out a gorge in the mountain range changing its direction. The river bottom does not fill completely with water. In areas where the river used to flow, the dry bottom occupies by the forest that grew on this place.

== Location ==
There are the city of Sarkand, the villages of Pokatilovka and Topolevka and the Zhalanash cordon on the territory of the tract. The territory is part of the natural Dzhongar-Alatau National Park. The tract is under the protection of the foresters of the Zhalanash cordon.

== Description ==
There is access to the Zhasylkol Lake from the Agynykatty gorge. The lake is a part of the natural park. Rock slabs are located in the area of Topolevka village. One of these slabs descends into a small river. A forest occupies part of the bank river, which originates at an altitude of 1200 m above sea level.

Fir, spruce, aspen, birch and poplar grow here. In some places can be seen the famous Sievers apple tree, which is the ancestor of all cultivated varieties of apple trees. Wooded ridges in this area are called manes (Nikonov mane, Vankov mane, etc.). The Agynykatty River is the largest tributary of the Lepsy River. There are apiaries and bivouac clearings along with it. Local residents collect the horns of marals from which the medicine Pantokrin is made, as well as useful plants such as golden root and other valuable medicinal herbs.

== Sources ==
- Лютерович О. Г. Три популярные экскурсии по Семиречью: Путеводитель, Алматы: «Service Press», 2016.- 92с.
- М. Гинатуллин Лингво краеведческий словарь. — Алматы: «Раритет», 2010.
