= C15H20O6 =

The molecular formula C_{15}H_{20}O_{6} (molar mass: 296.31 g/mol) may refer to:

- Rosin
- Trimethylolpropane triacrylate (TMPTA)
- Vomitoxin, also known as deoxynivalenol (DON)
