= Herbacetin =

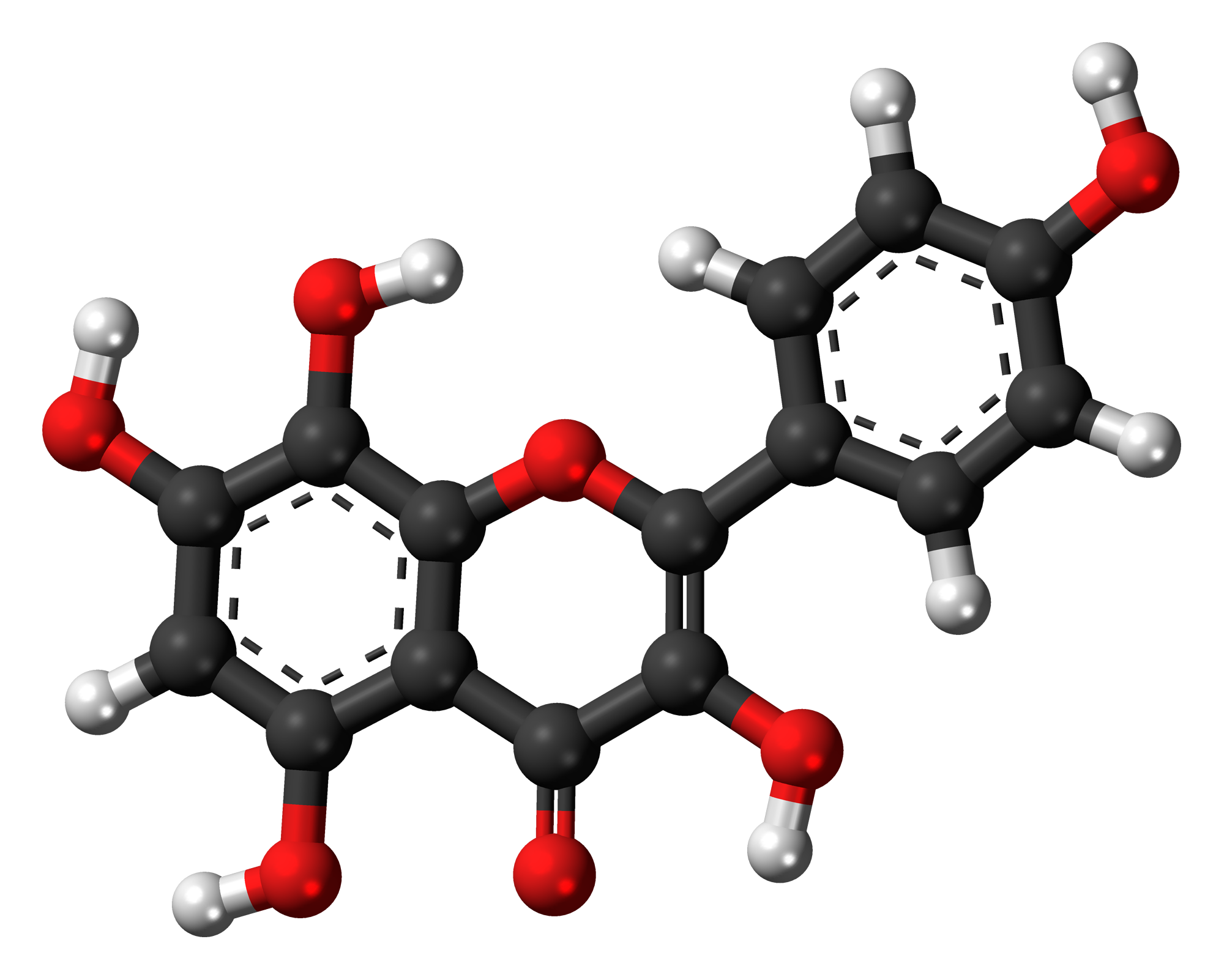

Names
- IUPAC name 3,4′,5,7,8-Pentahydroxyflavone
- Systematic IUPAC name 3,5,7,8-Tetrahydroxy-2-(4-hydroxyphenyl)-4H-1-benzopyran-4-one
- Other names 8-Hydroxykaempferol

Identifiers
CAS Number	527-95-7
3D model (JSmol)	Interactive image
ChEBI	CHEBI:27673
ChemSpider	4444174
ECHA InfoCard	100.237.124
PubChem CID	5280544
UNII	736854V2KE
CompTox Dashboard (EPA)	DTXSID70415061
- InChI: InChI=1S/C15H10O7/c16-7-3-1-6(2-4-7)14-13(21)12(20)10-8(17)5-9(18)11(19)15(10)22-14/h1-5,16-19,21H Key: ZDOTZEDNGNPOEW-UHFFFAOYSA-N; InChI=1/C15H10O7/c16-7-3-1-6(2-4-7)14-13(21)12(20)10-8(17)5-9(18)11(19)15(10)22-14/h1-5,16-19,21H Key: ZDOTZEDNGNPOEW-UHFFFAOYAP
- SMILES: C1=CC(=CC=C1C2=C(C(=O)C3=C(O2)C(=C(C=C3O)O)O)O)O

Properties
Chemical formula	C_{15}H_{10}O_{7}
Molar mass	302.238 g·mol^{−1}
Density	1.799 g/mL
- Except where otherwise noted, data are given for materials in their standard state (at 25 °C [77 °F], 100 kPa). verify (what is ?) Infobox references

Herbacetin is a flavonol, a type of flavonoid.

== Glycosides ==
Herbacetin diglucoside can be isolated from flaxseed hulls.

Rhodionin is a herbacetin rhamnoside found in Rhodiola species.

== Other related compounds ==
Rhodiolin, a flavonolignan, is the product of the oxidative coupling of coniferyl alcohol with the 7,8-dihydroxy grouping of herbacetin. It can be found in the rhizome of Rhodiola rosea.
