= Rosin (chemical) =

Names
- IUPAC name (2E)-3-Phenylprop-2-en-1-yl β-D-glucopyranoside
- Systematic IUPAC name (2R,3S,4S,5R,6R)-2-(Hydroxymethyl)-6-{[(2E)-3-phenylprop-2-en-1-yl]oxy}oxane-3,4,5-triol

Identifiers
| CAS Number | 85026-55-7; 69306-80-5 (non-specific) |
| 3D model (JSmol) | Interactive image |
| ChemSpider | 4444255 |
| EC Number | 232-475-7 |
| KEGG | C04183 |
| PubChem CID | 5280656 |
| UNII | SVS3GU8AY8 |
| CompTox Dashboard (EPA) | DTXSID60904535 |
- InChI: InChI=1S/C15H20O6/c16-9-11-12(17)13(18)14(19)15(21-11)20-8-4-7-10-5-2-1-3-6-10/h1-7,11-19H,8-9H2/b7-4+/t11-,12-,13+,14-,15-/m1/s1 Key: KHPCPRHQVVSZAH-GUNCLKARSA-N; InChI=1/C15H20O6/c16-9-11-12(17)13(18)14(19)15(21-11)20-8-4-7-10-5-2-1-3-6-10/h1-7,11-19H,8-9H2/b7-4+/t11-,12-,13+,14-,15-/m1/s1 Key: KHPCPRHQVVSZAH-GUNCLKARBM
- SMILES: C1=CC=C(C=C1)/C=C/CO[C@H]2[C@@H]([C@H]([C@@H]([C@H](O2)CO)O)O)O

Properties
| Chemical formula | C_{15}H_{20}O_{6} |
| Molar mass | 296.32 g/mol |
- Except where otherwise noted, data are given for materials in their standard state (at 25 °C [77 °F], 100 kPa). Infobox references

Rosin is a glycoside ester of cinnamyl alcohol and a constituent of Rhodiola rosea.

== Related compounds ==
The three cinnamyl alcohol-vicianosides of Rhodiola rosea, commonly referred to as "rosavins," are rosin, and the structurally related disaccharide rosavin, which is the arabinose ester of rosin, and rosarin, the arabinofuranose ester of rosin. Salidroside, common in Rhodiola spp. and occurring in Rhodiola rosea is not a cinnamyl alcohol glycoside, but a glycoside of tyrosol.

== Sources ==
The cinnamyl alcohol glycosides rosin, rosavin and rosarin occur in the context of rhodiola species, only in Rhodiola rosea.
