= Lignum rhodium =

Lignum rhodium is a common name for several plants and may refer to:

- Amyris balsamifera
- Convolvulus floridus
- Convolvulus scoparius
- Rhodiola rosea

- all of which have a rose-like fragrance, due to their containing certain essential oils - hence the common name combining Latin and Greek elements and signifying 'rose(-scented) wood'.
