= Cinnamol =

Cinnamol can refer to:

- A brand of cinnamon oil (cinnamon bark oil or oil of cinnamon)
- A brand of paracetamol in Nigeria
- An uncommon name of styrene (styrol, vinylbenzene, phenylethene, ethenylbenzene, cinnamène), so named when it was produced by decarboxylating cinnamic acid in the 1800s

== See also ==
- Cinnamyl alcohol
