= Brunner syndrome =

X-linked recessive disorder characterised by impulsive behaviour

- Other names: Monoamine oxidase A deficiency
- This condition is inherited in an X-linked recessive manner.
- Specialty: Medical genetics
- Symptoms: Impulsivity; aggression; sleep disturbances; periods of sweating, headaches, flushing, and diarrhea; intellectual disability
- Causes: Monoamine oxidase A (MAO-A) deficiency

Brunner syndrome is a rare genetic disorder associated with a mutation in the MAOA gene. It is characterized by lower than average IQ (typically about 85), problematic impulsive behavior (e.g., pyromania, hypersexuality, and violence), sleep disorders, and mood swings. It was identified in fourteen males from one family in 1993. It has since been discovered in additional families.

== Signs and symptoms ==
The following signs and symptoms occur in people with monoamine oxidase A deficiency, which causes Brunner syndrome:

- lack of impulse control
- aggressive or violent outbursts
- ASD or ADHD-like behavioral features
  - obsessive behaviors
  - difficulties forming friendships
  - problems focusing attention
- sleep problems
  - trouble falling asleep
  - night terrors
- skin flushing
- sweating
- headaches
- diarrhea

== Causes ==
Brunner syndrome is caused by a monoamine oxidase A (MAO-A) deficiency, which leads to an excess of monoamines in the brain, such as serotonin, dopamine, and norepinephrine (noradrenaline). In both mice and humans, a mutation was located on the eighth exon of the MAOA gene, which created a dysfunctional MAOA gene. The regular function of MAO-A, breaking down monoamines, is disrupted, and monoamines build up within the brain. Mice that lacked a functional MAOA gene displayed higher levels of aggression, in comparison to mice with a functional MAOA gene.

== Diagnosis ==
Molecular diagnosis establishing a mutation in the MAOA gene is possible, but establishing the clinical diagnosis is more challenging, since this condition is a variable spectrum disorder.

== Treatment ==
There is no restrictive treatment for Brunner syndrome, although a potential treatment can be established by checking the patient for signs and symptoms and analyzing different catabolites in bodily fluids, that would be indicative of excess amount of monoamines in the body and mediating the symptoms by targeting therapy for the most problematic neurotransmitter. For example, if a patient is found having excess amount of serotonin in the blood (hyperserotonemia) and abnormal urine 5-HIAA levels then the patient might benefit from a serotonin reuptake inhibitor and dietary modifications.

== History ==
Brunner syndrome was described in 1993 by H.G. Brunner and his colleagues upon the discovery of a particular genetic defect in male members of a large Dutch family. Brunner found that all of the male family members with this defect reacted aggressively when angry, fearful, or frustrated. The defect discovered was later found to be a mutation in the gene that codes for monoamine oxidase A (MAOA gene). Brunner said that an "MAO-A deficiency is associated with a recognizable behavioral phenotype that included disturbed regulation of impulsive aggression".

A letter published by Hebebrand and Klug (1995) criticized Brunner's findings for not using strict DSM criteria.

== Society and culture ==
Brunner's findings have been used to argue that genetics, rather than decision-making processes, can cause criminal activity. Evidence supporting the genetic defense stems from both Brunner's findings and a series of studies on mice. To prove the correlation between MAO-A deficiency and aggression in courts, it is often contended that individuals cannot be held accountable for their genes, and as a result, should not be held responsible for their dispositions and resulting actions.
