= Rhodionin =

- Chemical structure of rhodionin

Names
- IUPAC name 3,5,8-Trihydroxy-2-(4-hydroxyphenyl)-7-[(2S,3R,4R,5R,6S)-3,4,5-trihydroxy-6-methyloxan-2-yl]oxychromen-4-one
- Other names Herbacetin-7-O-α-L-rhamnopyranoside; Herbacetin 7-rhamnoside

Identifiers
CAS Number	85571-15-9
3D model (JSmol)	Interactive image
ChemSpider	10252127
PubChem CID	46226584
UNII	889FQ29409
CompTox Dashboard (EPA)	DTXSID60544233
- InChI: InChI=1S/C21H20O11/c1-7-13(24)16(27)18(29)21(30-7)31-11-6-10(23)12-15(26)17(28)19(32-20(12)14(11)25)8-2-4-9(22)5-3-8/h2-7,13,16,18,21-25,27-29H,1H3/t7-,13-,16+,18+,21-/m0/s1 Key: CIAXXTSXVCLEJK-JOEVVYSCSA-N; InChI=1/C21H20O11/c1-7-13(24)16(27)18(29)21(30-7)31-11-6-10(23)12-15(26)17(28)19(32-20(12)14(11)25)8-2-4-9(22)5-3-8/h2-7,13,16,18,21-25,27-29H,1H3/t7-,13-,16+,18+,21-/m0/s1 Key: CIAXXTSXVCLEJK-JOEVVYSCBK
- SMILES: Oc1ccc(cc1)C=3Oc4c(O)c(O[C@@H]2O[C@@H](C)[C@H](O)[C@@H](O)[C@H]2O)cc(O)c4C(=O)C=3O

Properties
Chemical formula	C_{21}H_{20}O_{11}
Molar mass	448.380 g·mol^{−1}
- Except where otherwise noted, data are given for materials in their standard state (at 25 °C [77 °F], 100 kPa). Infobox references

Rhodionin is a herbacetin rhamnoside found in Rhodiola species.
