= Salidroside =

Names
- IUPAC name 2-(4-Hydroxyphenyl)ethyl β-D-glucopyranoside
- Systematic IUPAC name (2R,3S,4S,5R,6R)-2-(Hydroxymethyl)-6-[2-(4-hydroxyphenyl)ethoxy]oxane-3,4,5-triol
- Other names Salidroside; Rhodioloside; Tyrosol glucoside

Identifiers
CAS Number	10338-51-9
3D model (JSmol)	Interactive image
ChEMBL	ChEMBL465208
ChemSpider	140088
ECHA InfoCard	100.224.258
PubChem CID	159278
UNII	M983H6N1S9
CompTox Dashboard (EPA)	DTXSID4049034
- InChI: InChI=1S/C14H20O7/c15-7-10-11(17)12(18)13(19)14(21-10)20-6-5-8-1-3-9(16)4-2-8/h1-4,10-19H,5-7H2/t10-,11-,12+,13-,14-/m1/s1 Key: ILRCGYURZSFMEG-RKQHYHRCSA-N; InChI=1/C14H20O7/c15-7-10-11(17)12(18)13(19)14(21-10)20-6-5-8-1-3-9(16)4-2-8/h1-4,10-19H,5-7H2/t10-,11-,12+,13-,14-/m1/s1 Key: ILRCGYURZSFMEG-RKQHYHRCBF
- SMILES: C1=CC(=CC=C1CCO[C@H]2[C@@H]([C@H]([C@@H]([C@H](O2)CO)O)O)O)O

Properties
Chemical formula	C_{14}H_{20}O_{7}
Molar mass	300.307 g·mol^{−1}
- Except where otherwise noted, data are given for materials in their standard state (at 25 °C [77 °F], 100 kPa). verify (what is ?) Infobox references

Salidroside (rhodioloside) is a glucoside of tyrosol found in the plant Rhodiola rosea. It has been studied, along with rosavin, as one of the potential compounds responsible for the putative antidepressant and anxiolytic actions of this plant. Salidroside may be more active than rosavin, even though many commercially marketed Rhodiola rosea extracts are standardized for rosavin content rather than salidroside.

== Bioactivities ==
Salidroside was shown to improve glucose homeostasis and alleviate diabetic retinopathy in obese mice. The antioxidant, anti-inflammatory and neuroprotective effects of salidroside have also been reported.

== Biosynthesis ==
The salidroside biosynthetic pathway in Rhodiola rosea was described in 2018. Rhodiola contains a pyridoxal phosphate-dependent 4-hydroxyphenylacetaldehyde (4-HPAA) synthase that converts tyrosine to 4-HPAA, which is further reduced to tyrosol by 4-HPAA reductase. Rhodiola contains a regio-selective tyrosol:UDP-glucose 8-O-glucosyltransferase that glycosylates tyrosol to produce salidroside.
