= Rosarin =

Names
- IUPAC name (2E)-3-Phenylprop-2-en-1-yl α-L-arabinofuranosyl-(1→6)-β-D-glucopyranoside
- Systematic IUPAC name (2R,3S,4S,5R,6R)-2-({[(2R,3R,4R,5S)-3,4-Dihydroxy-5-(hydroxymethyl)oxolan-2-yl]oxy}methyl)-6-{[(2E)-3-phenylprop-2-en-1-yl]oxy}oxane-3,4,5-triol

Identifiers
CAS Number	84954-93-8
3D model (JSmol)	Interactive image
ChemSpider	8495834
PubChem CID	10320370
UNII	PQA54L0KFI
CompTox Dashboard (EPA)	DTXSID601045580
- InChI: InChI=1S/C20H28O10/c21-9-12-14(22)17(25)20(29-12)28-10-13-15(23)16(24)18(26)19(30-13)27-8-4-7-11-5-2-1-3-6-11/h1-7,12-26H,8-10H2/b7-4+/t12-,13+,14-,15+,16-,17+,18+,19+,20+/m0/s1 Key: IEBFEMIXXHIISM-YZOUKVLTSA-N; InChI=1/C20H28O10/c21-9-12-14(22)17(25)20(29-12)28-10-13-15(23)16(24)18(26)19(30-13)27-8-4-7-11-5-2-1-3-6-11/h1-7,12-26H,8-10H2/b7-4+/t12-,13+,14-,15+,16-,17+,18+,19+,20+/m0/s1 Key: IEBFEMIXXHIISM-YZOUKVLTBR
- SMILES: C1=CC=C(C=C1)/C=C/CO[C@H]2[C@@H]([C@H]([C@@H]([C@H](O2)CO[C@H]3[C@@H]([C@H]([C@@H](O3)CO)O)O)O)O)O

Properties
Chemical formula	C_{20}H_{28}O_{10}
Molar mass	428.434 g·mol^{−1}
- Except where otherwise noted, data are given for materials in their standard state (at 25 °C [77 °F], 100 kPa). Infobox references

Rosarin is a cinnamyl alcohol glycoside isolated from Rhodiola rosea.

== See also ==
- Rosavin
- Rosin
