= Rhodiola crenulata =

Scientific classification
- Kingdom: Plantae
- Clade: Tracheophytes
- Clade: Angiosperms
- Clade: Eudicots
- Order: Saxifragales
- Family: Crassulaceae
- Genus: Rhodiola
- Species: R. crenulata

Binomial name
- Rhodiola crenulata (Hook.f. & Thomson) H.Ohba

Synonyms
- List: Rhodiola euryphylla (Fröd.) S.H.Fu; Rhodiola megalophylla (Fröd.) S.H.Fu; Rhodiola rotundata (Hemsl.) S.H.Fu; Sedum crenulatum Hook.f. & Thomson; Sedum euryphyllum Fröd.; Sedum megalanthum Fröd.; Sedum megalophyllum Fröd.; Sedum rotundatum Hemsl.; Sedum rotundatum var. oblongatum C.Marquand & Airy Shaw

Species of plant

Rhodiola crenulata is a species of flowering plant in the family Crassulaceae, native to the Himalayas. A geophyte usually 5 to 20 cm (2 to 8 in) tall, it is typically found at elevations from 2,800 to 5,600 m (9,200 to 18,400 ft) above sea level. Its genome has been sequenced.
