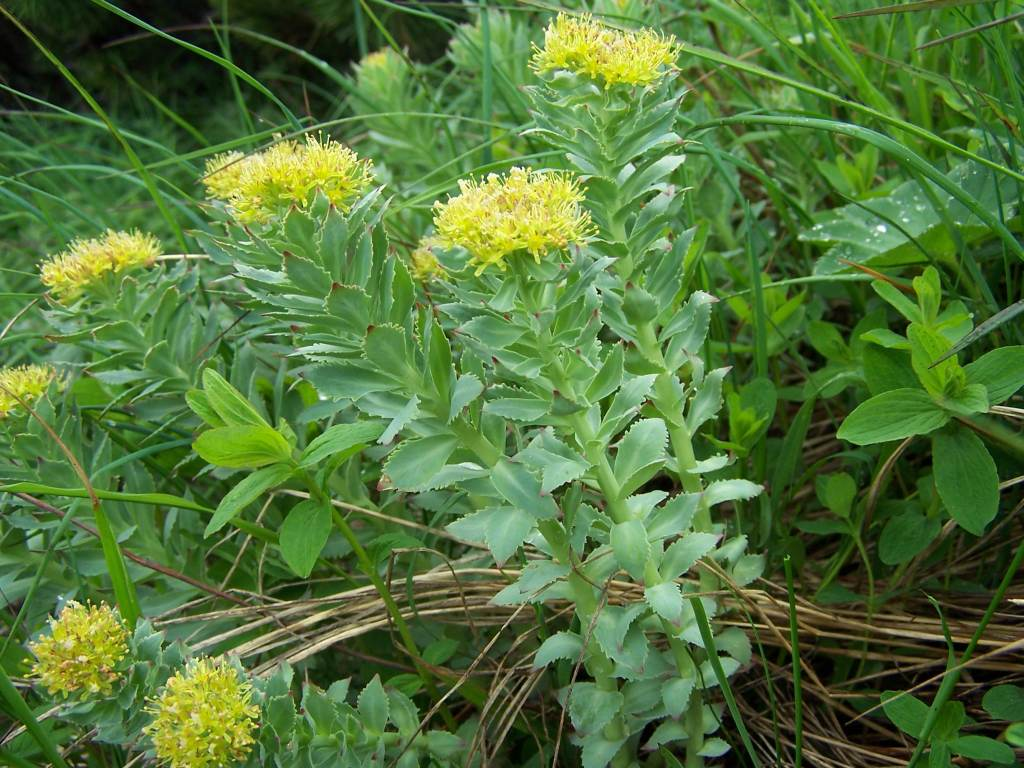

Scientific classification
- Kingdom: Plantae
- Clade: Tracheophytes
- Clade: Angiosperms
- Clade: Eudicots
- Order: Saxifragales
- Family: Crassulaceae
- Genus: Rhodiola
- Species: R. rosea

Binomial name
- Rhodiola rosea L.
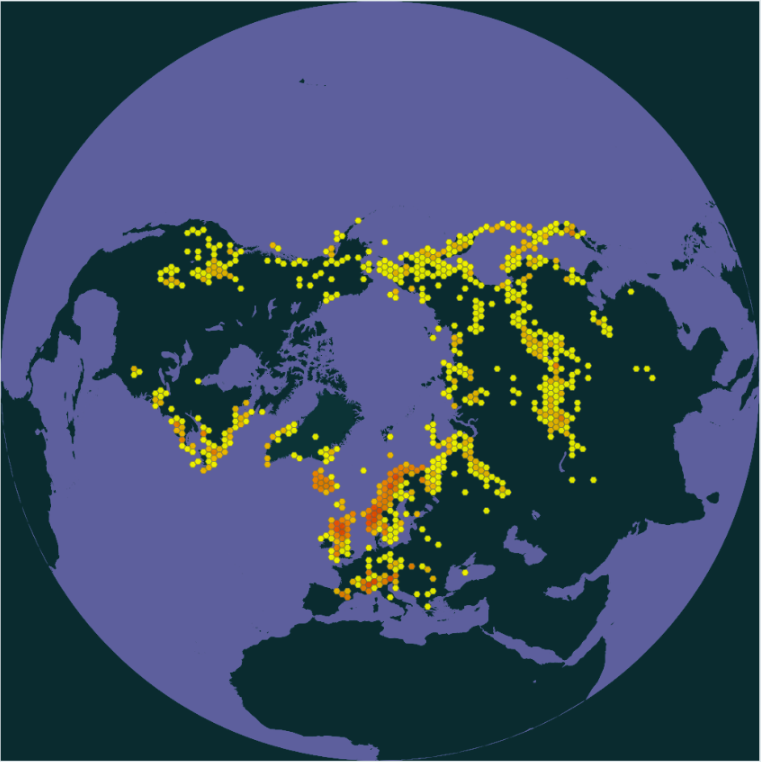

Synonyms
- Rhodiola roanensis (Britton) Britton; Sedum rhodiola DC.; S. roanense Britton; S. rosea (L.) Scop.; S. rosea var. roanense (Britton) A. Berger

= Rhodiola rosea =

Species of flowering plant in the stonecrop family

Rhodiola rosea (commonly golden root, rose root, roseroot, Aaron's rod, Arctic root, king's crown, lignum rhodium, orpin rose) is a perennial flowering plant in the family Crassulaceae. It grows naturally in wild Arctic regions of Europe (including Britain), Asia, and North America (New Brunswick, Newfoundland and Labrador, Nova Scotia, Quebec; Alaska, Maine, New York, North Carolina, Pennsylvania, Vermont), and can be propagated as a groundcover.

Although Rhodiola rosea has been used in traditional medicine, there is no high-quality clinical evidence of its effectiveness to treat any disease. The United States Food and Drug Administration has issued several warnings to manufacturers of R. rosea based dietary supplements for making false health claims about safety and efficacy.

The plant is threatened in many countries due to rapidly growing demand. R. rosea has been identified by various farmers and researchers as a potential cash crop naturally suited for cultivation in Arctic climates. Supply comes mostly from wild harvesting on an industrial scale, and a combination of growing scarcity and a lack of regulation has led to environmental degradation, substitution or adulteration in the market, and illegal harvesting in protected areas.

== Description ==
Rhodiola rosea is from 5 to 40 centimetres (2.0 to 15.7 in) tall, fleshy, and has several stems growing from a short, scaly rootstock. Flowers have 4 sepals and 4 petals, yellow to greenish yellow in color sometimes tipped with red, about 1 to 3.5 millimetres (0.039 to 0.138 in) long, and blooming in summer. Several shoots growing from the same thick root may reach 5 to 35 centimetres (2.0 to 13.8 in) in height. R. rosea is dioecious – having separate female and male plants.

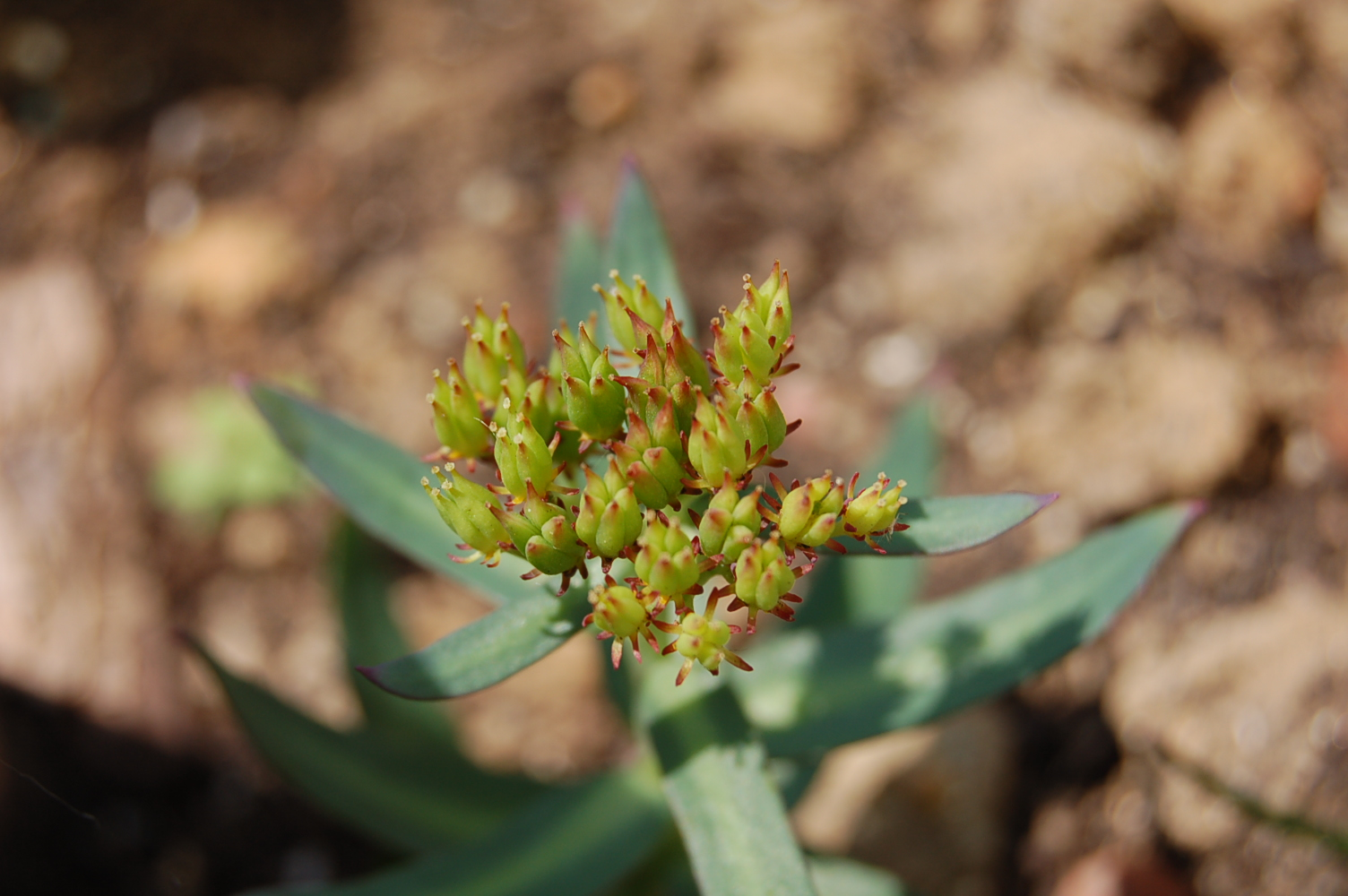
Rhodiola rosea in flower during the spring in the UK

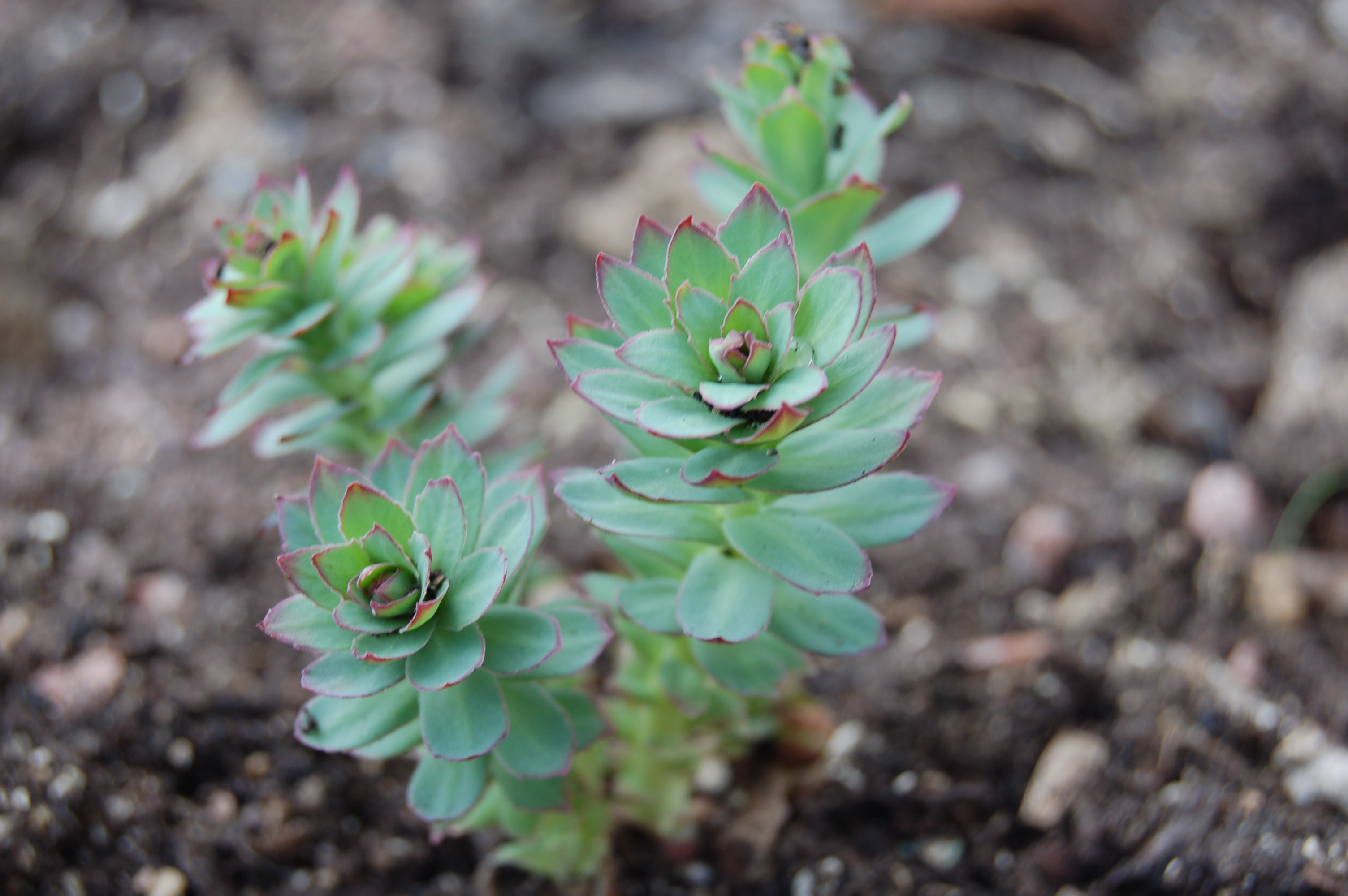
Rhodiola rosea sprouting new growth

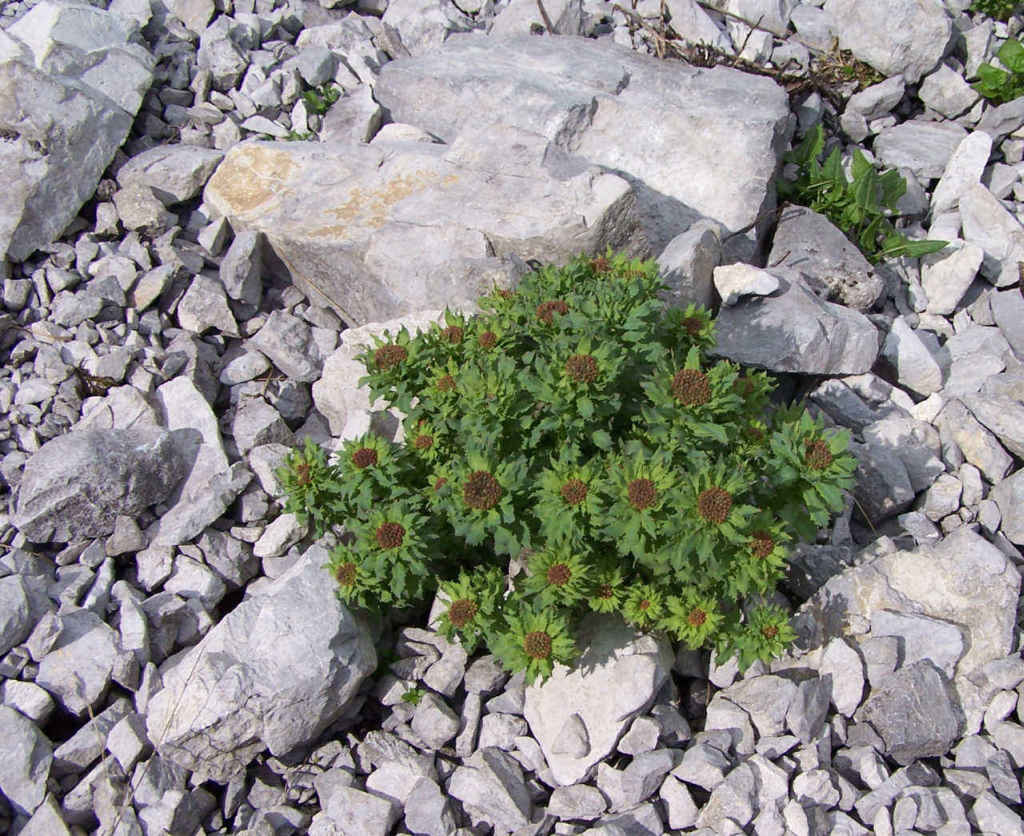
Wild Rhodiola rosea plant

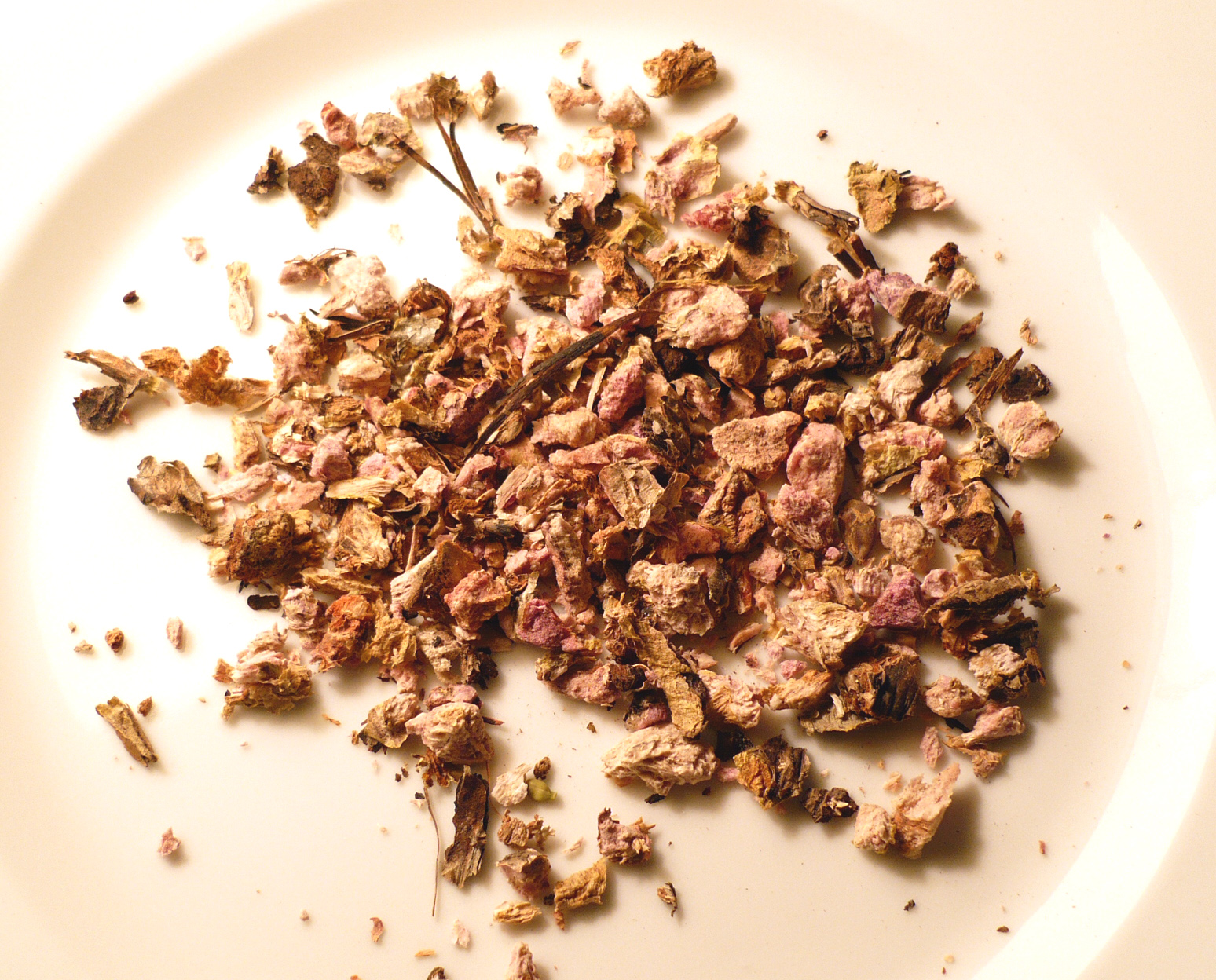
Dried R. rosea root

=== Taxonomy ===
Rhodiola rosea was first described by Pedanius Dioscorides in De Materia Medica. Many North American plants formerly included in R. rosea are now treated separately as Rhodiola integrifolia and Rhodiola rhodantha.

=== Chemical constituents ===
About 140 chemical compounds are in the subterranean portions of R. rosea. Rhodiola roots contain phenols, rosavin, rosin, rosarin, organic acids, terpenoids, phenolic acids and their derivatives, flavonoids, anthraquinones, alkaloids, tyrosol, and salidroside.

The chemical composition of the essential oil from R. rosea root growing in different countries varies. For example, rosavin, rosarin, and rosin at their highest concentration according to many tests can be found only in R. rosea of Russian origin; the main components of the essential oil from Rhodiola growing in Bulgaria are geraniol and myrtenol; in China the main components are geraniol and 1-octanol; and in India the main component is phenethyl alcohol. Cinnamyl alcohol was discovered only in the sample from Bulgaria.

Rosavin, rosarin, rosin, and salidroside (and sometimes p-tyrosol, rhodioniside, rhodiolin, and rosiridin) are mostly polyphenols, and have no evidence of a physiological effect in humans. Although these phytochemicals are typically mentioned as specific to Rhodiola rosea extracts, rosea and other Rhodiola species contain many other constituent polyphenols, including proanthocyanidins, quercetin, gallic acid, chlorogenic acid, and kaempferol.

== Distribution ==
Rhodiola rosea grows in cold regions of the world, including much of the Arctic, the mountains of Central Asia, scattered in eastern North America and mountainous parts of Europe. It grows on sea cliffs and on mountains at high altitude.

== Uses ==
=== Culinary use ===
The leaves and shoots can be eaten raw, having a bitter flavor. They can also be cooked like spinach or are sometimes added to salads. An extract is sometimes added as a flavoring in vodkas.

=== Research and regulation ===
Rhodiola has been used as a dietary supplement. According to Memorial Sloan Kettering Cancer Center, Rhodiola rosea is used in Asia and Eastern Europe in the forms of capsules, liquid extracts and tablets as a traditional medicine. Through 2019, human studies evaluating R. rosea did not have sufficient quality to determine whether it has properties affecting fatigue or any other condition. The U.S. Food and Drug Administration (FDA) has issued warning letters to manufacturers of R. rosea dietary supplement products unapproved as new drugs, adulterated, misbranded and in federal violation for not having proof of safety or efficacy for the advertised conditions of alleviating Raynaud syndrome, altitude sickness, depression or cancer.

A 2012 report by the European Medicines Agency on literature concerning the dried extract of R. rosea stated that "The published clinical trials exhibit considerable deficiencies in their quality. Therefore 'well-established use' cannot be accepted".

== Protection and management ==
Rhodiola rosea has not been assessed on the IUCN red list, but is listed on the CITES (Convention on International Trade in Endangered Species of Wild Fauna and Flora) Appendix II which "includes species not necessarily threatened with extinction, but in which trade must be controlled in order to avoid utilization incompatible with their survival.".

== See also ==
- Rhodiola
- Rhodiola integrifolia
