= Zhasylkol Lake =

Lake in Kazakhstan

- Жасылкөл (Kazakh)
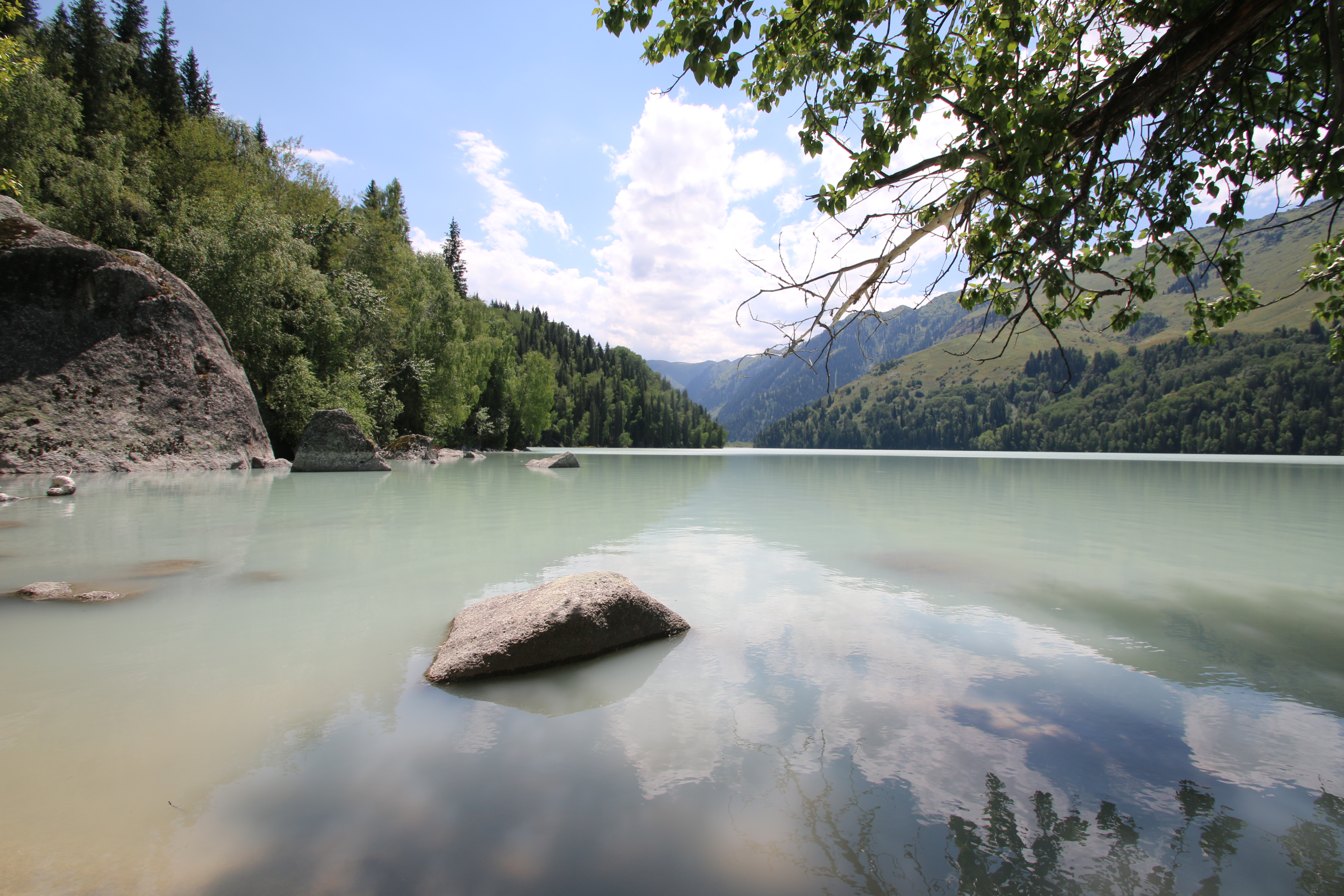

- Location within Kazakhstan
- Location: Kazakhstan
- Coordinates: 45.386°N 80.579°E

Zhasylkol Lake (or Жасылкөл) is a lake in Jetisu Region, Kazakhstan. It is on the northern slope of the Dzungarian Alatau ridge.

== History ==
As a result of a catastrophic earthquake several millennia ago, a stone blockage was formed from the right slope, which blocked the course of the Kikozen river with a natural dam, forming a picturesque lake.

== Description ==
Lake Zhasylkol is located on the Northern slope of the Dzungarian Alatau ridge in the valley of the Agynykatty river at an altitude of 1640 meters above sea level. People call it emerald. When the glaciers melt, the lake becomes a bright green color, especially if you look at it from above. The color of the lake's water depends not only on snowmelt, but also on the time of day and weather. In spring and summer, the water is muddy the color of coffee with milk, in autumn and spring, it becomes transparent blue. At noon, the water has a turquoise hue, with a blue sky, the water becomes the color of ultramarine, in cloudy weather it becomes leaden. The greatest length of lake Superior from the North shore to the South, to the mouth of the river Aguacate is 2.07 km (1.29 mi), the greatest width in the Northern part of the lake – 751 m (2,464 ft), depth presumably 30 to 50 m (98 to 164 ft) of mirror area – 912,000 m^{2} (9,820,000 sq ft). 9 km (5.6 mi), to the South, from lake Superior, the river takes Aguacate Eastern tributary of the river Ekiasha, which in turn is formed by the confluence of two small rivers – Western tributary of the river Balcony and East of a tributary of the Bark. The Kora river originates from the meltwater of the Satpayev glacier, which ends in the South with the Kara-Choki pass, along which the state border between Kazakhstan and the Republic of China runs in the latitudinal direction. The dense forest starts from the height of 1,200 m (3,900 ft). Here grow fir, spruce, aspen, birch and poplar. It is here in Dzungaria that the most apple trees in Kazakhstan remain (49%), including the Sievers apple tree, which is the ancestor of all most domestic apple trees on Earth.

On the shores of the lake, deciduous groves have grown. The area of lake Zhasylkol is an excellent habitat for a large population of marals. Until the 1980s, almost no human set foot here because the state border between China and Kazakhstan passes here.

The lake is located in Zhetysu Alatau, 23 km (14 mi) southwest of the village of Lepsinsk, in the middle reaches of the Kikozen river, one of the sources of the Agynykatty river. From the wheat apiary to the lake along the path winding along the valley of the Agynykatty river – about 10 km (6.2 mi), from the lake to the Jaeger cordon Zhalanash more than 13 km (8.1 mi). The object is part of the state national nature Park Zhongar-Alatau and has a favorable acoustic environment (e.g. silence and melodic sounds in nature). The best time to travel is from May to October
