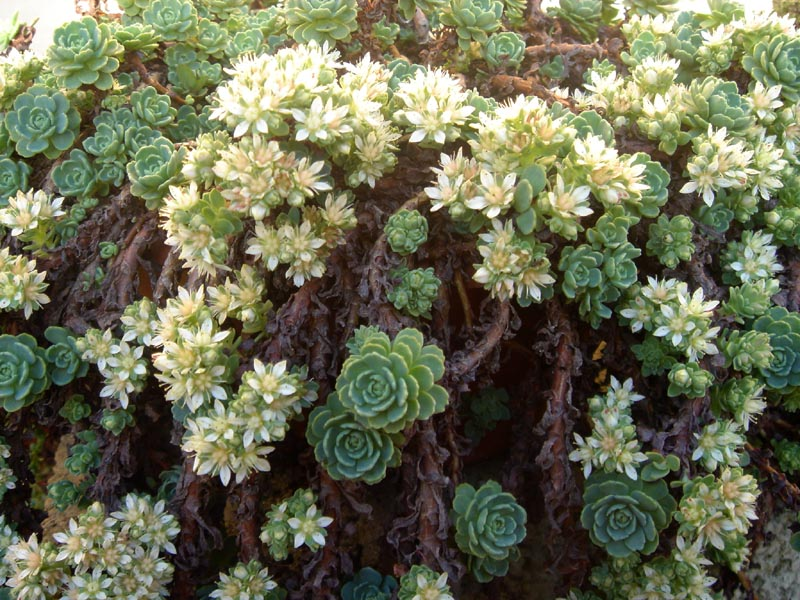

Scientific classification
- Kingdom: Plantae
- Clade: Tracheophytes
- Clade: Angiosperms
- Clade: Eudicots
- Order: Saxifragales
- Family: Crassulaceae
- Genus: Rhodiola
- Species: R. pachyclados

Binomial name
- Rhodiola pachyclados (Aitch. ex Hemsl.) H.Ohba

Synonyms
- Rhodiola primuloides var. pachyclados (Aitch. ex Hemsl.) H.Jacobsen; Sedum pachyclados Aitch. & Hemsl

= Rhodiola pachyclados =

Species of plant

Rhodiola pachyclados, the gray stonecrop, is a species of succulent flowering plant in the family Crassulaceae. It is an evergreen, succulent plant native to Pakistan and Afghanistan, but widely cultivated as an ornamental plant. It was formerly included in the genus Sedum.

== Taxonomy ==
Rhodiola pachyclados was originally described as Sedum pachyclados by J. E. T. Aitchison and William Hemsley in 1880. Hideaki Ohba transferred it from Sedum to a new genus, Rhodiola, in 1976.

Rhodiola pachyclados looks somewhat like plants in the genus Rosularia, but it can be identified by its broad-based radical leaves. It also differs from Rhodiola primuloides, of which it was once considered a subspecies, by having shallowly lobed radical leaves, petals with smooth edges, and flower clusters containing 3–8 flowers.

== Description ==
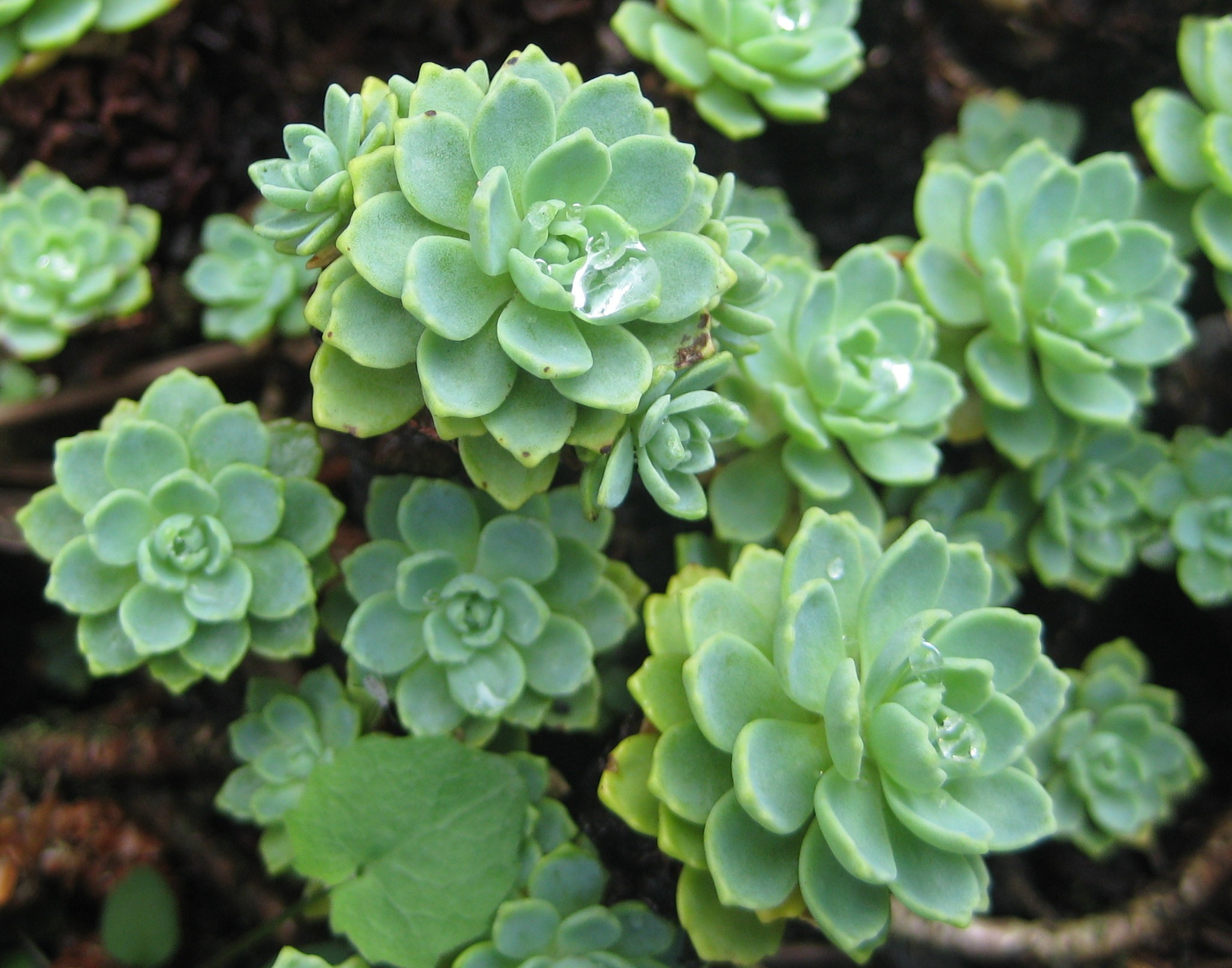
The rosettes of Rhodiola pachyclados form cushion-like hummocks.

Rhodiola pachyclados grows 2–3 cm tall and spreads through thin, underground stems called rhizomes, which are 2–4 mm wide. It forms clusters of rosettes—compact, circular arrangements of leaves—each with 12–18 thick, bluish-green evergreen leaves about 1.5–2.5 cm across. Below these, a few withered old leaves may persist. The lower leaves (radical leaves) are broad and oval-shaped, measuring 4–10 mm long and 2.7–6 mm wide. Their edges may have shallow lobes (small rounded projections) or be smooth, and they gradually narrow at the base. The short leaf stalk (petiole) is broad and flattens out towards the base. The rosettes create tight, cushion-like hummocks, often appearing impenetrable to other vegetation.

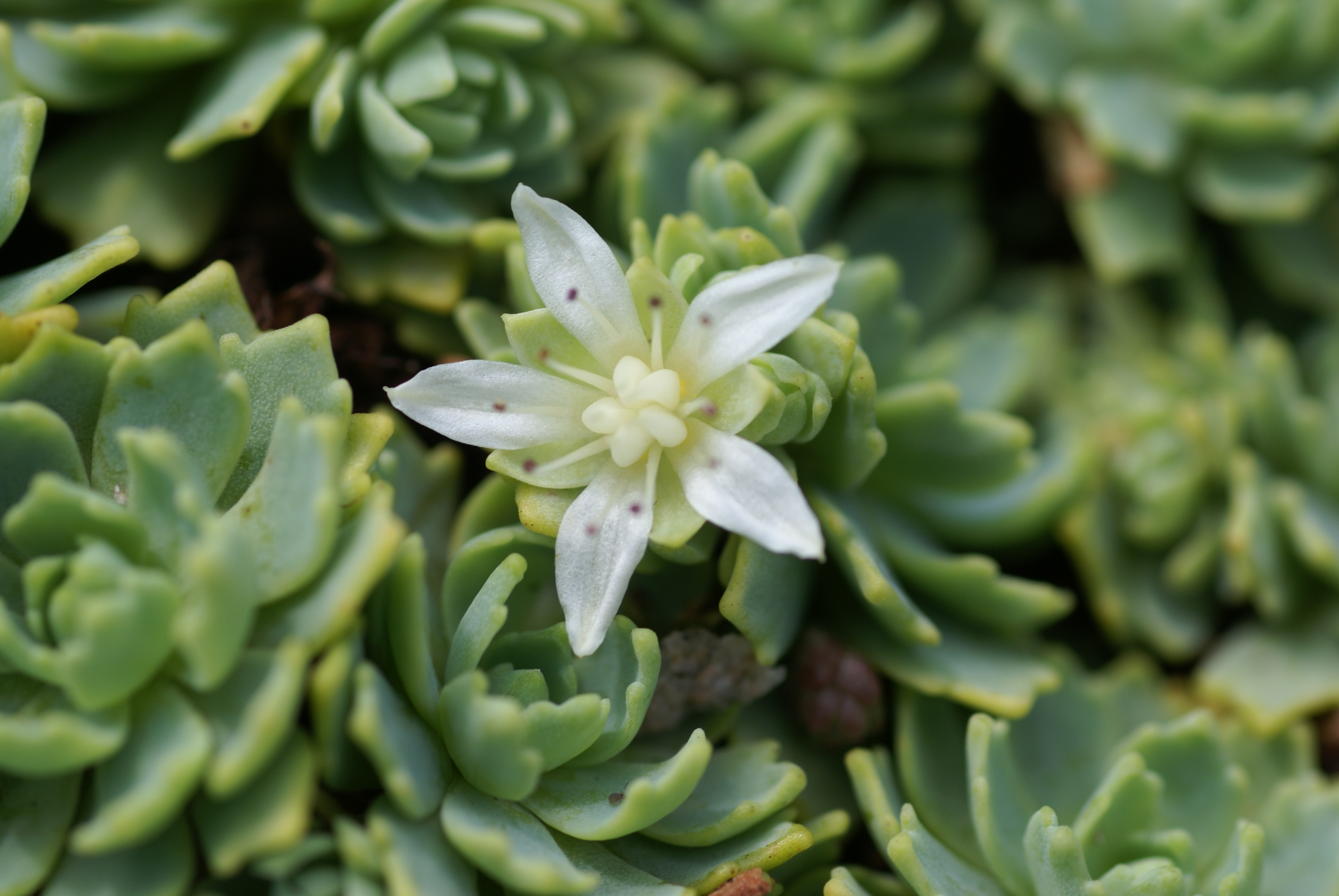
Rhodiola pachyclados is a hermaphrodite plant; both male and female reproductive parts can be seen in its flower.

Each rosette of Rhodiola pachyclados produces a single flowering stem, which has small, narrow, spoon-shaped leaves attached directly to it (without stalks). These leaves are 4–5.5 mm long and 1.6–2.2 mm wide. The flowers form a rounded cluster, called inflorescence, measuring 0.8–2 cm across and usually contain 3–8 individual flowers. The flowers are 3.5–4.5 mm across and grow on tiny, hairless stalks (pedicels) that are 0.5–1 mm long. The greenish outer flower parts (sepals) are 3.6–4 mm long and shaped like stretched-out ovals. The inner, petals, are 6–7 mm long, slender, and gradually widen towards the tip. Their edges are smooth. The stamens (pollen-producing structures) are shorter than the petals, and the anthers (pollen sacs) are reddish. The nectary glands are oblong and reddish, measuring 0.7–0.9 mm long. The seed-producing structures (carpels) are 6.5–7.5 mm long, each containing 8–12 ovules (developing seeds). The styles (slender structures that connect the ovary to the stigma) are 1.5–2 mm long.

== Distribution and cultivation ==
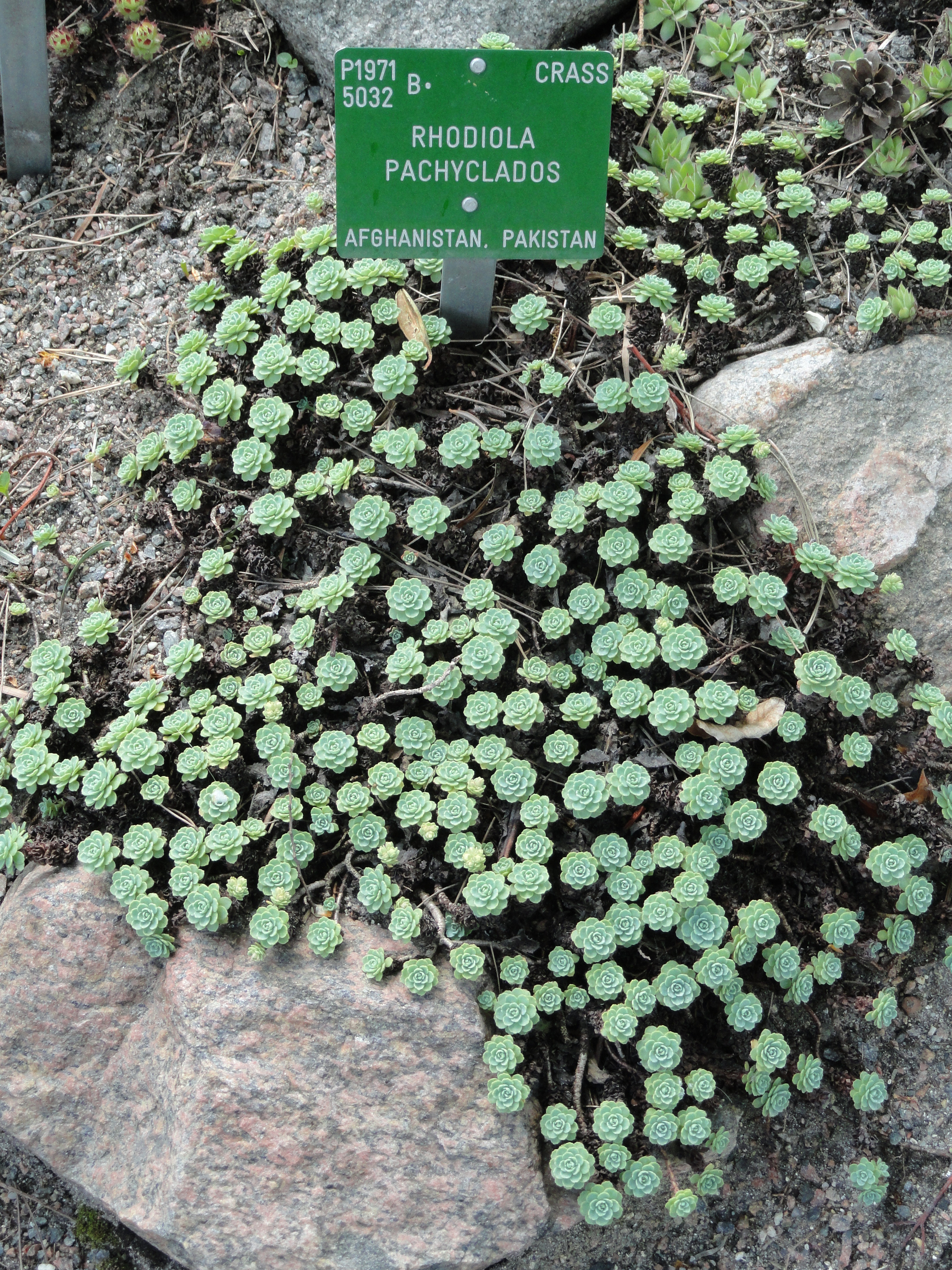
Rhodiola pachyclados is appreciated in cultivation for its tendency to drape over rocks

Rhodiola pachyclados is native to the Western Himalayas of Afghanistan and Pakistan, occurring at elevations between 2,400 and 3,400 meters. It has rapidly gained popularity in cultivation as an ornamental plant. In the 1970s, it was primarily referenced in scientific literature, but by 1994 it had become widely propagated, with demand exceeding supply. Under favorable conditions, R. pachyclados forms a dense mound up to 45 cm across within five years. It readily spreads over rocks and can overtake smaller, weaker plants. The species is highly adaptable and, unusually for a succulent plant, performs well in cold, wet winters, better even than when kept dry under shelter.
