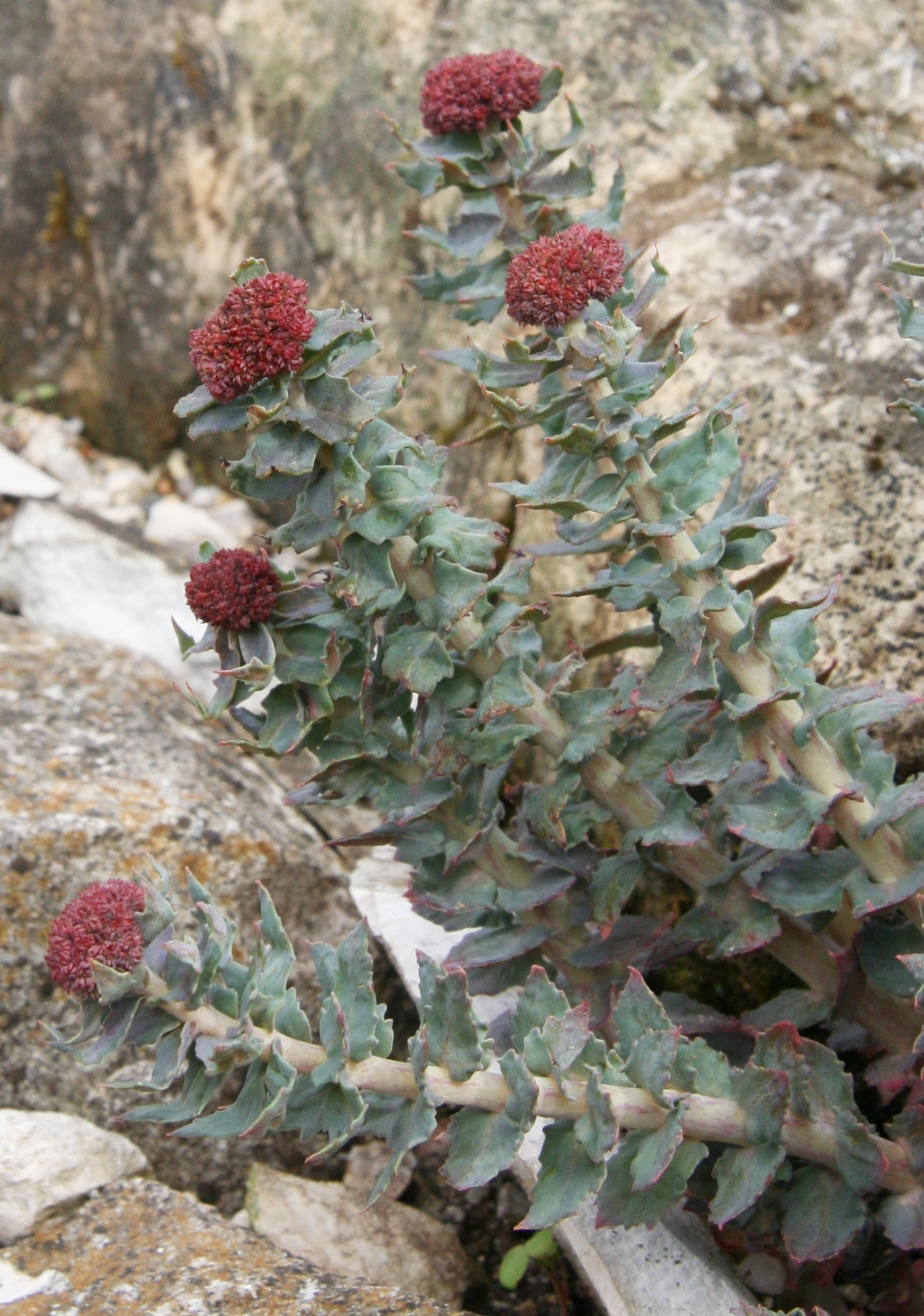
- Rhodiola heterodonta

Scientific classification
- Kingdom: Plantae
- Clade: Embryophytes
- Clade: Tracheophytes
- Clade: Angiosperms
- Clade: Eudicots
- Order: Saxifragales
- Family: Crassulaceae
- Subfamily: Sempervivoideae
- Tribe: Umbiliceae
- Genus: Rhodiola; L.

Species
- c. 90

Synonyms
- Rosea Fabr.

= Rhodiola =

Genus of flowering plants

Rhodiola is a genus of perennial plants in the family Crassulaceae that resemble Sedum and other members of the family. Like sedums, Rhodiola species are often called stonecrops. Some authors merge Rhodiola into Sedum.

Rhodiola species grow in high-altitude and other cold regions of the Northern Hemisphere. Plants of the World Online gives the number of accepted species as 74, the Angiosperm Phylogeny Website gives it as 90, and the Flora of China gives it as about 90, with 55 in China and 16 endemic there. Flora of North America lists only three species in the United States and Canada.

== Description ==
Among the distinguishing characters of the genus are two series of stamens totaling twice the number of petals; free or nearly free petals (not joined in a tube); a stout rhizome from whose axils the flowering stems rise; and a basal rosette of leaves. This genus contains the only species of Crassulaceae that have unisexual flowers.

=== Phytochemistry ===
Rhodionin is a herbacetin rhamnoside found in Rhodiola species.

- Rhodiolin [86831-53-0]
- Rhodiolgin [94696-39-6]

== Taxonomy ==
Although Linnaeus distinguished Rhodiola from Sedum on the basis of being dioecious, it was later submerged in the latter genus until the twentieth century, when it was restored, on the basis of well developed rhizomes and annual flowering stems, arising from axils of the scaly radical leaves. This separation was subsequently confirmed by molecular phylogenetic studies.

Rhodiola is placed within family Crassulaceae, in subfamily Sempervivoideae, tribe Umbiliceae. There it is a sister group to Pseudosedum, though some authors have suggested that the latter genus be submersed within Rhodiola.

=== Subdivision ===
Traditionally Rhodiola was divided into subgenera, sections and series, based on plant characteristics. Four subgenera were recognised; Rhodiola, Primuloides, Crassipedes and Clementsia. However molecular studies have failed to demonstrate monophyly of these subtaxa.

Species include:

- Rhodiola crenulata
- Rhodiola integrifolia
- Rhodiola pachyclados
- Rhodiola rhodantha
- Rhodiola rosea

=== Etymology ===
The name combines the Greek rhodon, meaning rose and referring to the rose-like smell of the roots, with the Latin diminutive suffix -iola.

== Ecology ==
Dioecy, having separate male and female flowers, has evolved at least three times in the genus, and reversals to a hermaphrodite condition have also occurred, which is a rare occurrence in flowering plants. It has been suggested that dioecy in the genus may correlate with abiotic pollination in the cold environment.

== Uses ==
Rhodiola extracts have been used historically in medicine throughout Europe. A number of species are grown as ornamentals, but growing them is difficult outside their native subarctic and alpine climates.

In traditional Chinese medicine, extracts of Rhodiola plants are used for conditions such as fatigue and altitude sickness.

Currently, there is insufficient evidence to determine if Rhodiola is effective for any health condition.

== Bibliography ==
- Eggli, Urs; Newton, Leonard E. (2004). "Rhodiola". Etymological Dictionary of Succulent Plant Names. Springer Science & Business Media. p. 203. ISBN 978-3-540-00489-9.
- Linnaeus, Carl (1753). "Rhodiola". Species Plantarum: exhibentes plantas rite cognitas, ad genera relatas, cum differentiis specificis, nominibus trivialibus, synonymis selectis, locis natalibus, secundum systema sexuale digestas. Vol. 2. Stockholm: Impensis Laurentii Salvii. p. 1035., see also Species Plantarum
- Thiede, J; Eggli, U (2007). "Crassulaceae". In Kubitzki, Klaus (ed.). Berberidopsidales, Buxales, Crossosomatales, Fabales p.p., Geraniales, Gunnerales, Myrtales p.p., Proteales, Saxifragales, Vitales, Zygophyllales, Clusiaceae Alliance, Passifloraceae Alliance, Dilleniaceae, Huaceae, Picramniaceae, Sabiaceae. Springer. pp. 83–119. ISBN 978-3540322146. (full text at ResearchGate)
- Li, Tao; Zhang, Hao (2008). "Identification and Comparative Determination of Rhodionin in Traditional Tibetan Medicinal Plants of Fourteen Rhodiola Species by High-Performance Liquid Chromatography-Photodiode Array Detection and Electrospray Ionization-Mass Spectrometry". Chemical & Pharmaceutical Bulletin. 56 (6): 807–814. doi:10.1248/cpb.56.807. PMID 18520085.
- Mayuzumi, Shinzo; Ohba, Hideaki (2004). "The Phylogenetic Position of Eastern Asian Sedoideae (Crassulaceae) Inferred from Chloroplast and Nuclear DNA Sequences". Systematic Botany. 29 (3): 587–598. Bibcode:2004SysBo..29..587M. doi:10.1600/0363644041744329. ISSN 0363-6445. JSTOR 25063994. S2CID 84319808.
- Zhang, Jian-Qiang; Meng, Shi-Yong; Wen, Jun; Rao, Guang-Yuan (1 June 2014). "Phylogenetic Relationships and Character Evolution of Rhodiola (Crassulaceae) based on Nuclear Ribosomal ITS and Plastid trnL-F and psbA-trnH Sequences". Systematic Botany. 39 (2): 441–451. Bibcode:2014SysBo..39..441Z. doi:10.1600/036364414X680753. S2CID 86198481.
- Stevens, P.F. (2019) [2001]. "Crassulaceae". Angiosperm Phylogeny Website. Missouri Botanical Garden. (see also Angiosperm Phylogeny Website)
