= Cinnamyl alcohol =

- Skeletal formula

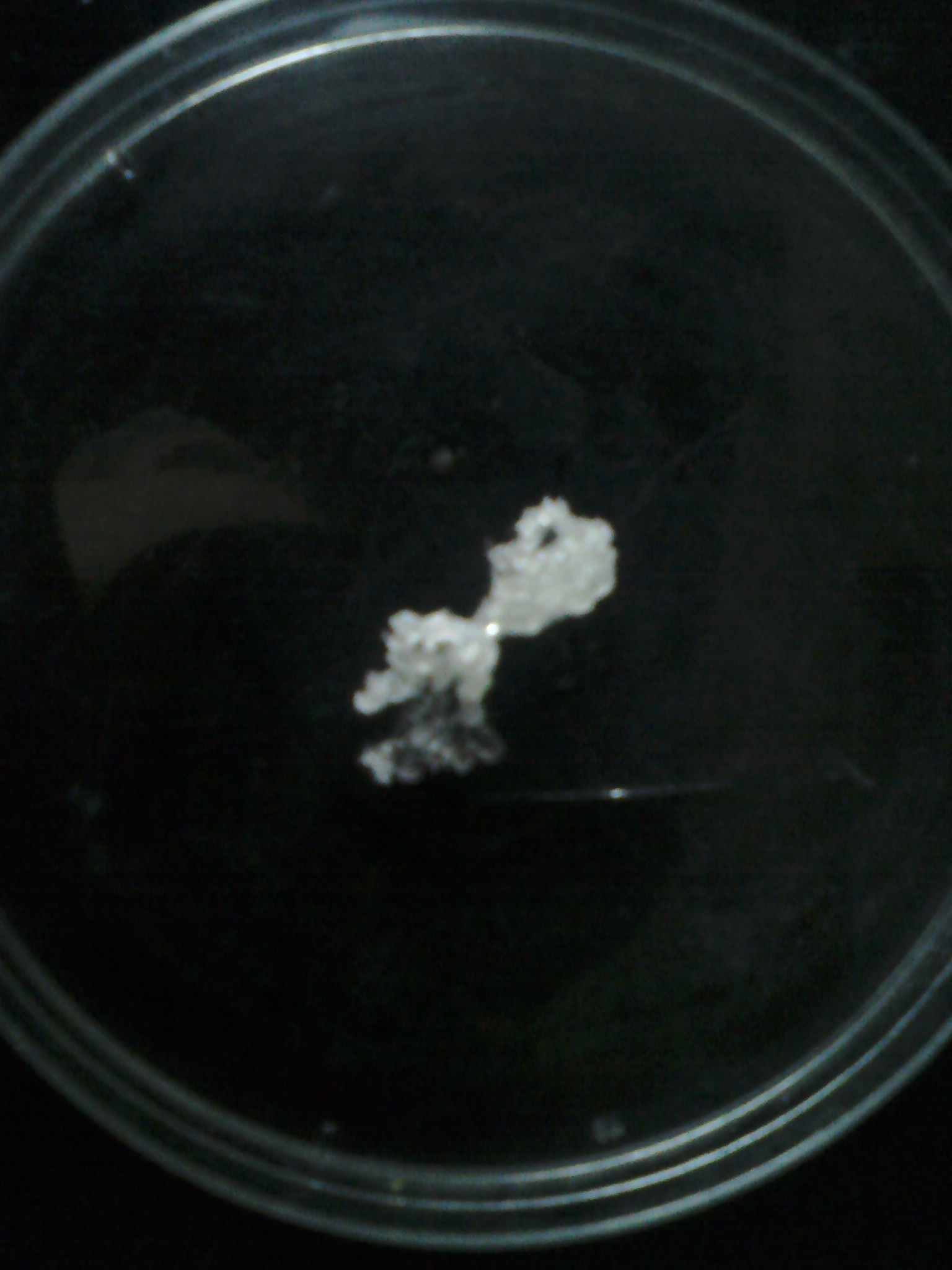
- A sample of cinnamyl alcohol on a petri dish.

Names
- Preferred IUPAC name (2E)-3-Phenylprop-2-en-1-ol
- Other names Cinnamyl alcohol Cinnamic alcohol Styryl carbinol Phenylallyl alcohol Styron

Identifiers
CAS Number	4407-36-7; 104-54-1 (non-specific)
3D model (JSmol)	Interactive image
ChEBI	CHEBI:33227
ChEMBL	ChEMBL324794
ChemSpider	21105870
ECHA InfoCard	100.216.224
EC Number	203-212-3
KEGG	C02394
PubChem CID	5315892
UNII	SS8YOP444F
CompTox Dashboard (EPA)	DTXSID301314144
- InChI: InChI=1S/C9H10O/c10-8-4-7-9-5-2-1-3-6-9/h1-7,10H,8H2/b7-4+ Key: OOCCDEMITAIZTP-QPJJXVBHSA-N; InChI=1/C9H10O/c10-8-4-7-9-5-2-1-3-6-9/h1-7,10H,8H2/b7-4+ Key: OOCCDEMITAIZTP-QPJJXVBHBG
- SMILES: c1ccc(cc1)/C=C/CO

Properties
Chemical formula	C_{9}H_{10}O
Molar mass	134.178 g·mol^{−1}
Density	1.0397 g/cm^{3} at 35 °C
Melting point	33 °C (91 °F; 306 K)
Boiling point	250 °C (482 °F; 523 K)
Solubility in water	Slightly
Solubility	soluble in ethanol, acetone, dichloromethane
Magnetic susceptibility (χ)	−87.2·10^{−6} cm^{3}/mol

Hazards
- GHS labelling
Pictograms	(GHS07: Exclamation mark)
Signal word	Warning
Hazard statements	H317
Precautionary statements	P261, P272, P280, P302+P352, P321, P333+P313, P363, P501
Flash point	126 °C (259 °F; 399 K)
Safety data sheet (SDS)	External MSDS

Related compounds
Related compounds	Cinnamic acid; Cinnamaldehyde
- Except where otherwise noted, data are given for materials in their standard state (at 25 °C [77 °F], 100 kPa). verify (what is ?) Infobox references

Cinnamyl alcohol or styron is an organic compound that is found in esterified form in storax, Balsam of Peru, and cinnamon leaves. It forms a white crystalline solid when pure, or a yellow oil when even slightly impure. It can be produced by the hydrolysis of storax.

Cinnamyl alcohol occurs naturally only in small quantities, so its industrial demand is usually fulfilled by chemical synthesis starting from cinnamaldehyde.

== Properties ==
The compound is a solid at room temperature, forming colorless crystals that melt upon gentle heating. As is typical of most higher-molecular weight alcohols, it is sparingly soluble in water at room temperature, but highly soluble in most common organic solvents.

== Uses ==
Cinnamyl alcohol has a distinctive odor described as "sweet, balsam, hyacinth, spicy, green, powdery, cinnamic" and is used in perfumery and as a deodorant.

Cinnamyl alcohol is the starting material used in the synthesis of reboxetine.

There is basic medical research investigating the neuroprotective properties of cinnamyl alcohol in terms of the following with respect to epilepsy:

- Potentiating the GABAergic system
- Promoting antioxidant effects
- Reducing pro-inflammatory mediators activities.

== Safety ==
Cinnamyl alcohol has been found to have a sensitizing effect on some people and as a result is the subject of a Restricted Standard issued by the International Fragrance Association.

== Glycosides ==
Rosarin and rosavin are cinnamyl alcohol glycosides isolated from Rhodiola rosea.
