= Rosiridin =

Names
- IUPAC name (2R,3R,4S,5S,6R)-2-{[(2E,4S)-4-Hydroxy-3,7-dimethylocta-2,6-dien-1-yl]oxy}-6-(hydroxymethyl)oxane-3,4,5-triol

Identifiers
CAS Number	100462-37-1
3D model (JSmol)	Interactive image
ChemSpider	23359976
EC Number	875-665-0
PubChem CID	25068281
UNII	71AL4K0H19
CompTox Dashboard (EPA)	DTXSID80438024
- InChI: InChI=1S/C16H28O7/c1-9(2)4-5-11(18)10(3)6-7-22-16-15(21)14(20)13(19)12(8-17)23-16/h4,6,11-21H,5,7-8H2,1-3H3/b10-6+/t11-,12+,13+,14-,15+,16+/m0/s1 Key: PBPYEEMQIFDGSQ-MOIFMYGASA-N
- SMILES: CC(=CC[C@@H](/C(=C/CO[C@H]1[C@@H]([C@H]([C@@H]([C@H](O1)CO)O)O)O)/C)O)C

Properties
Chemical formula	C_{16}H_{28}O_{7}
Molar mass	332.393 g·mol^{−1}
- Except where otherwise noted, data are given for materials in their standard state (at 25 °C [77 °F], 100 kPa). Infobox references

Rosiridin is a chemical compound that has been isolated from Rhodiola sachalinensis. Rosiridin can inhibit monoamine oxidases A and B, possibly meaning that the compound could help in the treatment of depression and senile dementia.
