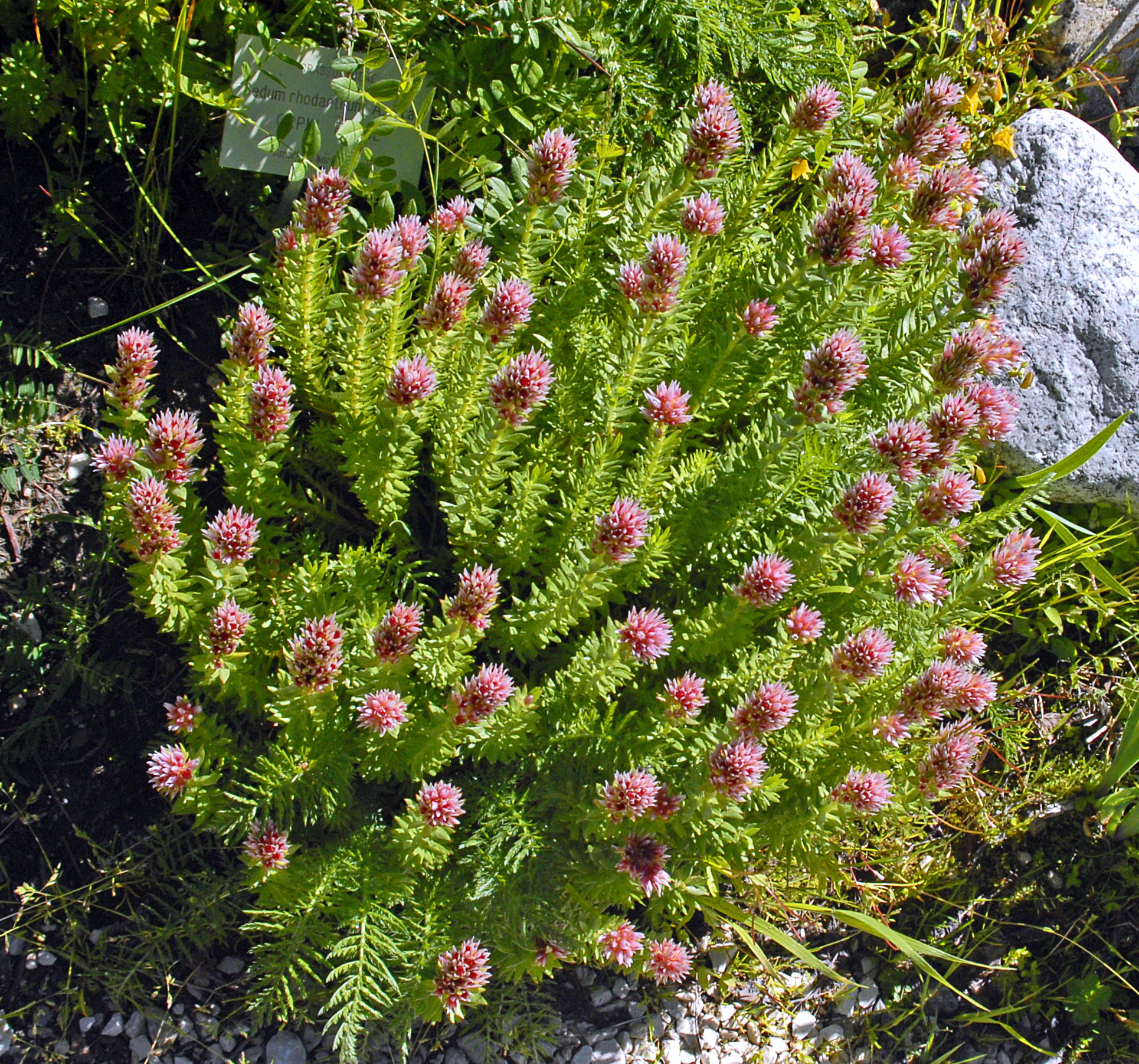
- Plants of Rhodiola rhodantha

Conservation status
- Secure (NatureServe)

Scientific classification
- Kingdom: Plantae
- Clade: Tracheophytes
- Clade: Angiosperms
- Clade: Eudicots
- Order: Saxifragales
- Family: Crassulaceae
- Genus: Rhodiola
- Species: R. rhodantha

Binomial name
- Rhodiola rhodantha (A.Gray) H.Jacobsen

Synonyms
- Clementsia rhodantha (A.Gray) Rose (1903); Sedum rhodanthum A.Gray (1862)

= Rhodiola rhodantha =

Species of flowering plant

Rhodiola rhodantha, common name redpod stonecrop or queen's crown, is a perennial flowering plant in the family Crassulaceae.

== Distribution ==
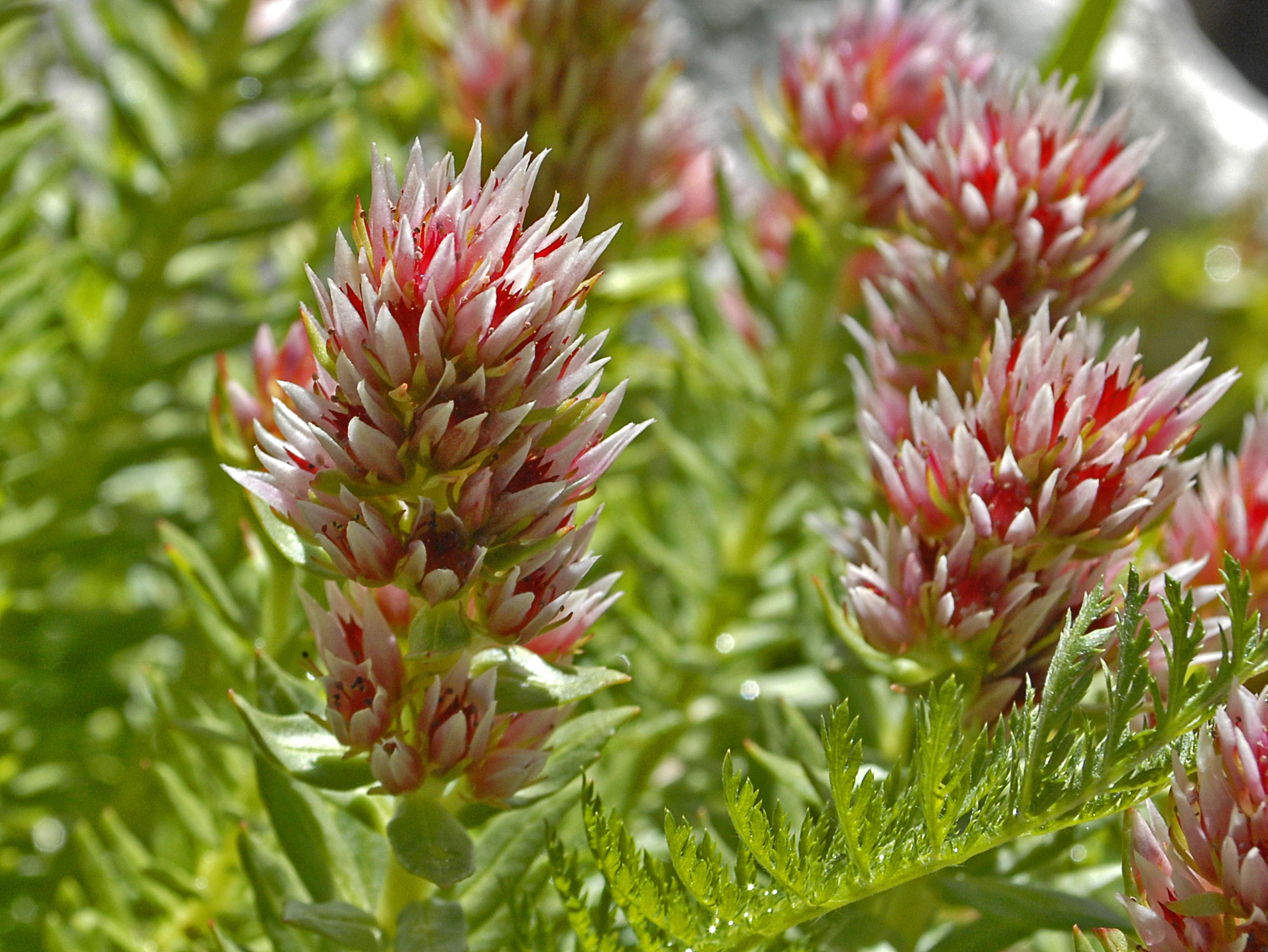
Rhodiola rhodantha inflorescences

This species is present in the United States (Arizona, Colorado, Montana, New Mexico, Utah, and Wyoming). It is native to the Rocky Mountains, at an elevation up to 2,700 metres (8,900 ft) above sea level.

== Description ==
Rhodiola rhodantha can reach a height of about 45 centimetres (18 in). These plants have small, lanceolate and succulent leaves without petiole. They are green at the bottom of the plant whereas at the top they are reddish. The flowers are hermaphrodite, may be rose or reddish and form an inflorescence. They bloom from July to August and the seeds ripen from August to September.
