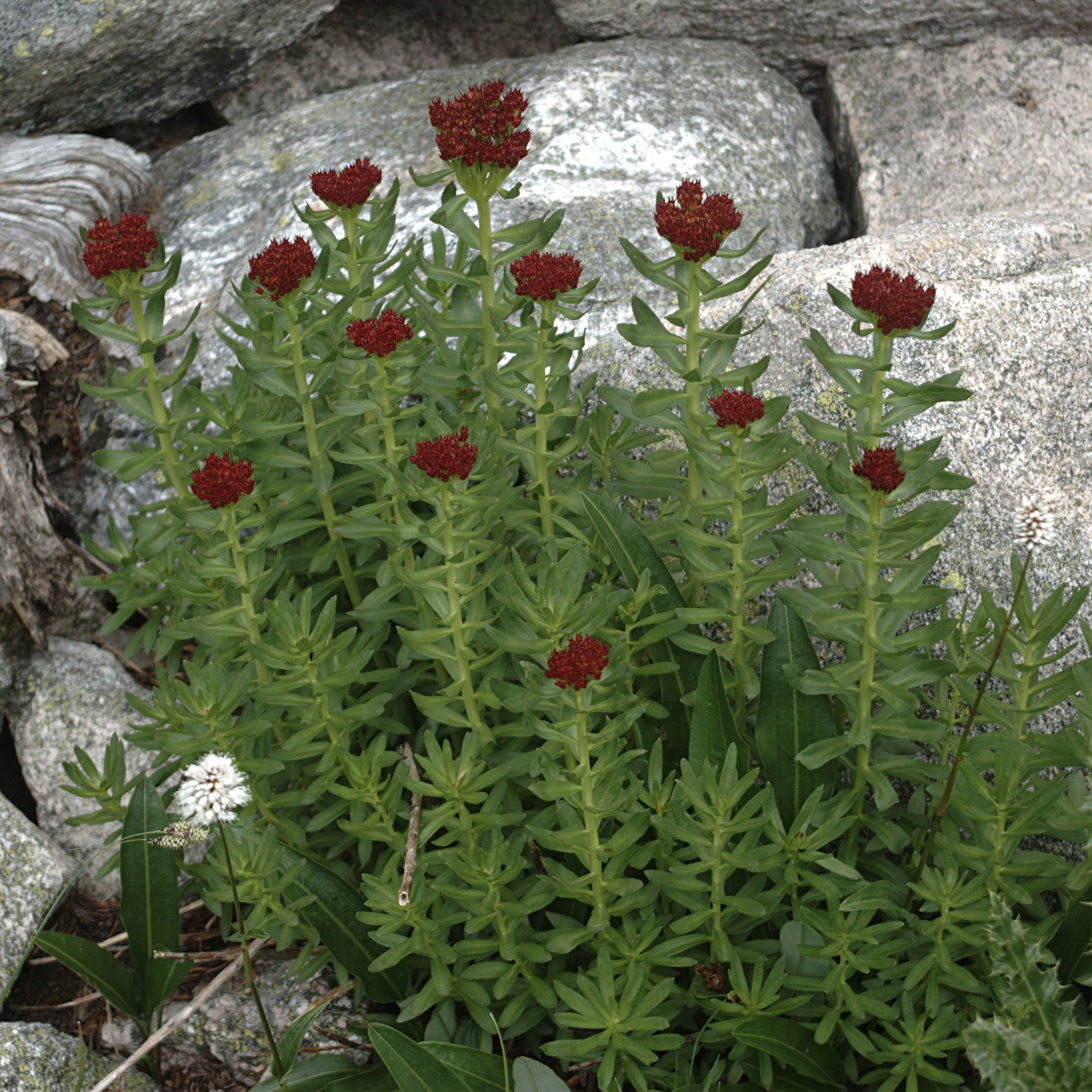

Conservation status
- Secure (NatureServe)

Scientific classification
- Kingdom: Plantae
- Clade: Tracheophytes
- Clade: Angiosperms
- Clade: Eudicots
- Order: Saxifragales
- Family: Crassulaceae
- Genus: Rhodiola
- Species: R. integrifolia

Binomial name
- Rhodiola integrifolia Raf.

Subspecies
- Rhodiola integrifolia subsp. integrifolia; Rhodiola integrifolia subsp. leedyi (Rosend. & J.W.Moore) H.Ohba; Rhodiola integrifolia subsp. neomexicana (Britton) Kartesz

Synonyms
- List: Rhodiola rosea subsp. integrifolia (Raf.) Kozhevn. (1981); Rhodiola rosea var. integrifolia (Raf.) Jeps. (1925); Rhodiola rosea subsp. integrifolia (Raf.) H.Hara (1952); Sedum integrifolium (Raf.) A.Nelson (1909); Sedum rosea subsp. integrifolium (Raf.) Hultén (1945); Sedum rosea var. integrifolium (Raf.) A.Berger (1930); Tolmachevia integrifolia (Raf.) Á.Löve & D.Löve (1975)

= Rhodiola integrifolia =

Species of plant

Rhodiola integrifolia is a species of flowering plant in the stonecrop family known by the common names ledge stonecrop, western roseroot, and king's crown. It is native to north-easternmost Russia, including Kamchatka, and western North America, where it grows in mountainous habitat in subalpine and alpine climates, including meadows, cliffs, and talus. It is a perennial herb producing a stout stem from a fleshy, branching caudex, reaching a maximum height near 30 centimeters. The fleshy leaves are alternately arranged on the stem, widely lance-shaped to oval and pointed, flat but upcurved toward the tip, reaching 2.5 centimeters long. They are green when new and age to orange, rose, or red. The inflorescence is a dense cyme of up to 50 flowers with fleshy petals in shades of bright red to deep purple. The fruits are red, rounded ovals with pointed tips.

There are several subspecies of this plant, with one, ssp. leedyi, very rare and limited to a few populations in Minnesota and upstate New York. This subspecies is considered a relict from times when its range was covered in glaciers; it survives on barren cliffs which are kept cold by air blowing through cracks from caves. It is treated as a federally listed threatened species in the United States. In 2024, a team at Cornell University successfully established a population of the plants in a nearby canyon, helping to prevent the plant from becoming extinct.
