= Rosavin =

Names
- IUPAC name (2E)-3-Phenylprop-2-en-1-yl α-L-arabinopyranosyl-(1→6)-α-D-glucopyranoside
- Systematic IUPAC name (2S,3R,4S,5S,6R)-2-{[(2E)-3-Phenylprop-2-en-1-yl]oxy}-6-({[(2S,3R,4S,5S)-3,4,5-trihydroxyoxan-2-yl]oxy}methyl)oxane-3,4,5-triol

Identifiers
CAS Number	84954-92-7
3D model (JSmol)	Interactive image
ChEBI	CHEBI:139523
ChemSpider	4945006
PubChem CID	9823887
UNII	1R72C0ROME
CompTox Dashboard (EPA)	DTXSID101027577
- InChI: InChI=1S/C20H28O10/c21-12-9-28-19(17(25)14(12)22)29-10-13-15(23)16(24)18(26)20(30-13)27-8-4-7-11-5-2-1-3-6-11/h1-7,12-26H,8-10H2/b7-4+/t12-,13+,14-,15+,16-,17+,18+,19-,20+/m0/s1
- SMILES: C1[C@@H]([C@@H]([C@H]([C@@H](O1)OC[C@@H]2[C@H]([C@@H]([C@H]([C@@H](O2)OC/C=C/C3=CC=CC=C3)O)O)O)O)O)O

Properties
Chemical formula	C_{20}H_{28}O_{10}
Molar mass	428.434 g·mol^{−1}
- Except where otherwise noted, data are given for materials in their standard state (at 25 °C [77 °F], 100 kPa). Infobox references

Rosavin is a chemical compound with the molecular formula C_{20}H_{28}O_{10}. It is a diglycoside of cinnamyl alcohol. Rosavin and related glycosides of cinnamyl alcohol, including rosin and rosarin, are key chemical constituents of Rhodiola rosea L., (R. rosea). R. rosea is an important medicinal plant commonly used throughout Europe, Asia, and North America, that has been recognized as a botanical adaptogen by the European Medicines Agency. Rosavin production is specific to R. rosea and R. sachalinenis, and the biosynthesis of these glycosides occurs spontaneously in Rhodiola roots and rhizomes. The production of rosavins increases in plants as they get older, and the amount of the cinnamyl alcohol glycosides depends on the place of origin of the plant.

== Biosynthesis ==
Cinnamyl alcohol glycosides are products of phenylpropanoid metabolism, derived from phenylalanine, which is produced from the shikimic-chorismic acid pathway. Shikimic acid is made from the precursor compounds erythrose-4-phosphate, and phosphoenolpyruvate. Shikimic acid is then converted to chorismic acid through various enzymes derived from the shikimic-chorismic acid pathway. Chorismate mutase then converts chorismic acid to prephenate via a Claisen rearrangement (1,3-sigmatropic rearrangement). Phenolpyruvate is generated by the decarboxylation of prephenate, and the loss of a water molecule. Phenylalanine ammonia lyase (PAL) then converts phenolpyruvate to phenylalanine by using L-glutamate as an amine donor, which is used in rosavin biosynthesis. In the first step of rosavin synthesis, PAL converts phenylalanine to cinnamic acid. From cinnamic acid, cinnamyl-CoA ester is formed through hydroxycinnamate: CoA ligase (4CL). This CoA ester is reduced to cinnamaldehyde by cinnamyl-CoA reductase (CCR). The cinnamaldehyde is further reduced by cinnamyl alcohol dehydrogenase (CAD) to cinnamyl alcohol. The enzymes that take part in the formation of the glycosides of cinnamyl alcohol are not yet known. By one glucose transfer, rosin is formed, which is the simplest glycoside of R. rosea. Rosavin is formed by the addition of an arabinose residue to rosin, while rosarin is generated by the addition of an arabinofuranose residue to rosin. Depending on the sugar type, and the site it is attached to, various other glycosides may be formed.

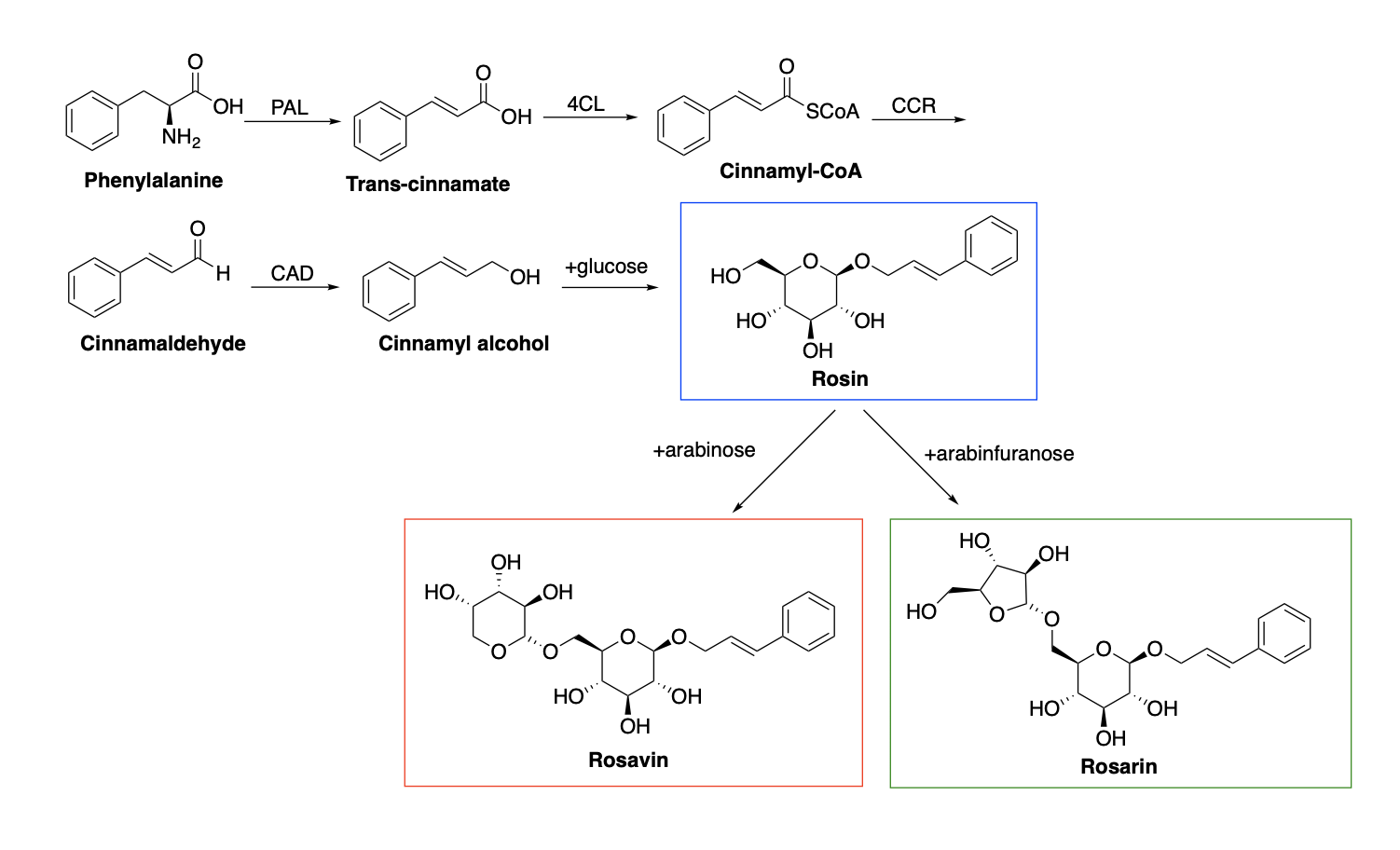
Biosynthetic Pathway to Produce Rosavins (Rosin, Rosavin, Rosarin)

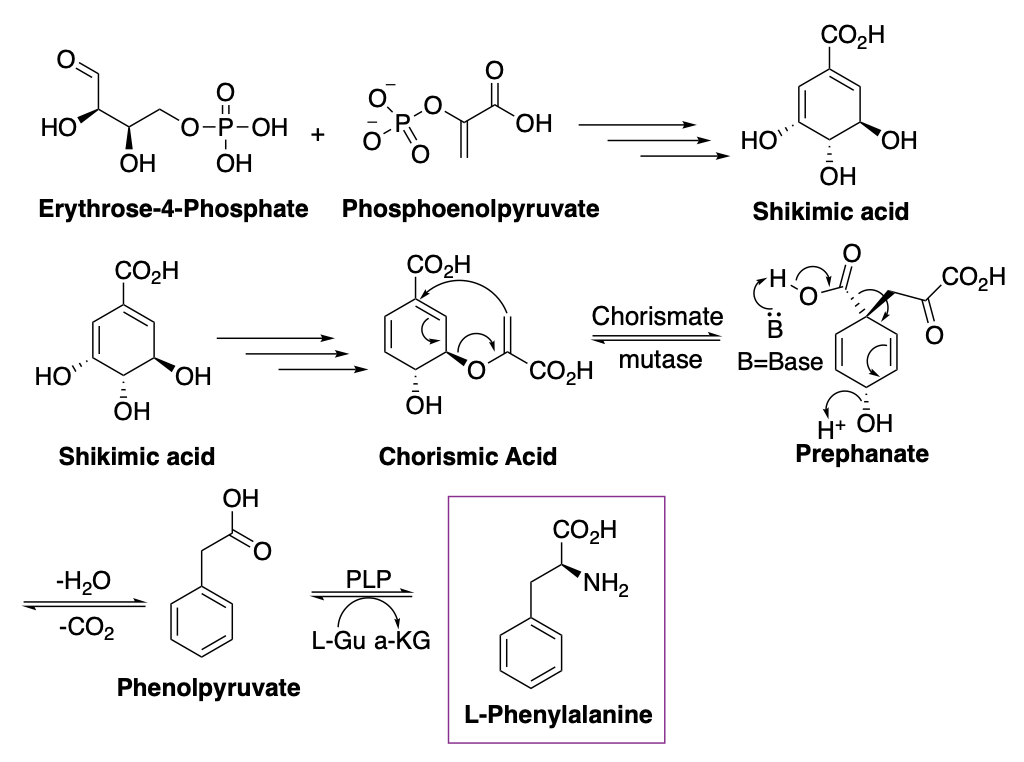
Biosynthesis of L-Phenylalanine

== Applications ==
Rosavins are considered to be the major active components of R. rosea, and clinical trials of R. rosea extract have reported positive efficacy on fatigue, depression, mountain sickness, and cardiovascular disease. Extracts used in most clinical trials are standardized to a minimum of 3% cinnamyl alcohol glycosides and 0.8–1.0% salidroside, as the naturally occurring ratio of these compounds in the plant rhizomes is approximately 3:1. Rosavins have also been reported to display immunomodulatory effects, radiation protection, anti-cancer activities, protective effects on bleomycin-induced pulmonary fibrosis, and induced antidepressant-like effects in mouse models. The low content of rosavins in plants has limited further investigation of their activities, and there is great interest in producing rosavins using biotechnology.
