= Moclobemide =

Antidepressant

- Molecular structure of moclobemide

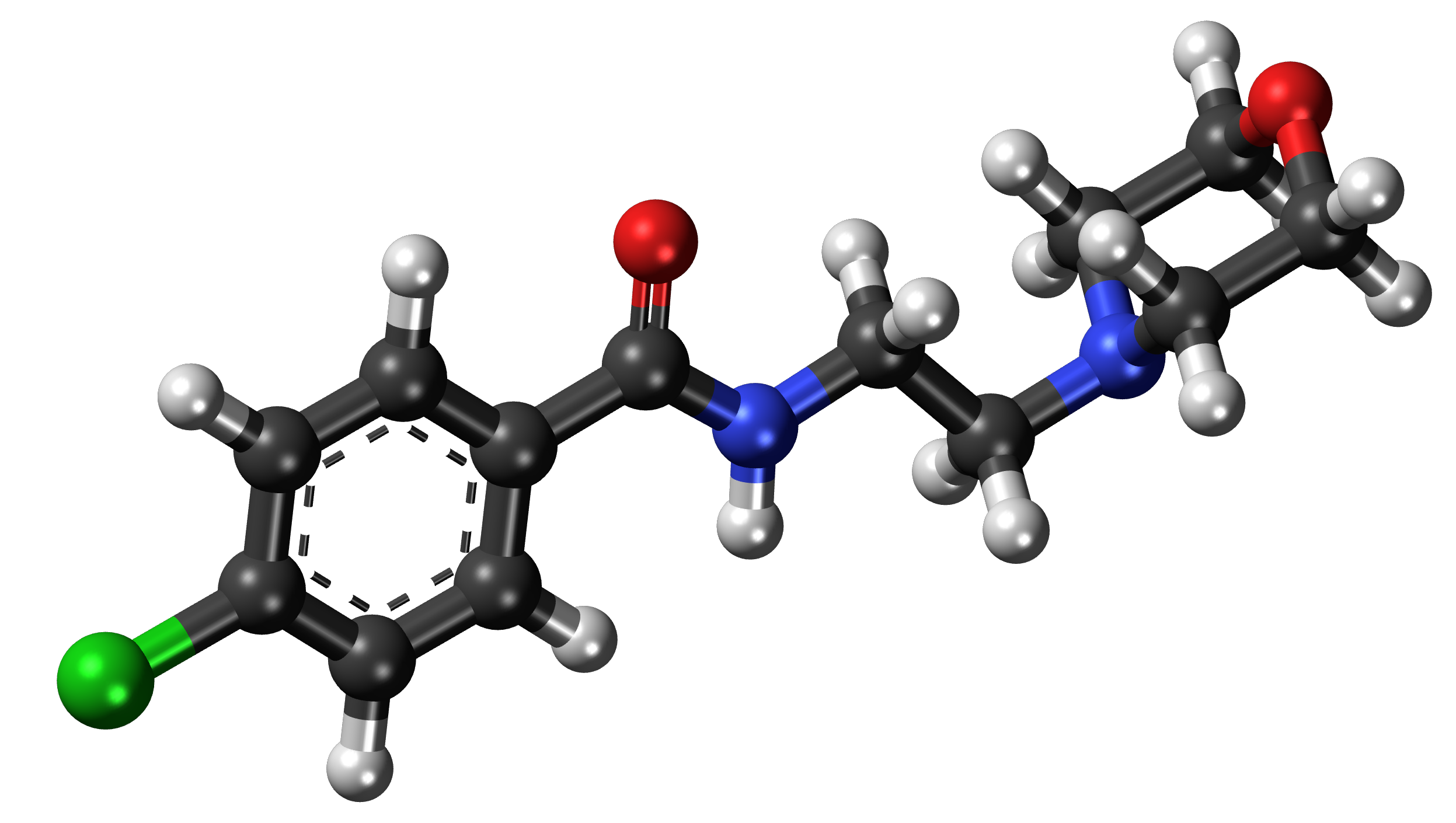
- 3D representation of a moclobemide molecule

Clinical data
- Trade names: Amira, Aurorix, Clobemix, Depnil, Manerix, others
- AHFS/Drugs.com: Micromedex Detailed Consumer Information
- Pregnancy category: AU: B3
- Routes of administration: Oral
- Drug class: Reversible inhibitor of monoamine oxidase A, antidepressant
- ATC code: N06AG02 (WHO)

Legal status
- Legal status: AU: S4 (Prescription only); BR: Class C1 (Other controlled substances); CA: ℞-only; UK: POM (Prescription only)

Pharmacokinetic data
- Bioavailability: 55–95% (increases with repeat administration)
- Protein binding: 50%
- Metabolism: Liver
- Elimination half-life: 1–2 hours, 4 hours (elderly)
- Excretion: Kidney, Faecal (<5%)

Identifiers
- IUPAC name: 4-chloro-N-(2-morpholin-4-ylethyl)benzamide
- CAS Number: 71320-77-9
- PubChem CID: 4235
- IUPHAR/BPS: 7428
- DrugBank: DB01171
- ChemSpider: 4087
- UNII: PJ0Y7AZB63
- KEGG: D02561
- ChEBI: CHEBI:83531
- ChEMBL: ChEMBL86304
- CompTox Dashboard (EPA): DTXSID9040554
- ECHA InfoCard: 100.163.935

Chemical and physical data
- Formula: C_{13}H_{17}ClN_{2}O_{2}
- Molar mass: 268.74 g·mol^{−1}
- 3D model (JSmol): Interactive image
- SMILES: Clc1ccc(cc1)C(=O)NCCN2CCOCC2
- InChI: InChI=1S/C13H17ClN2O2/c14-12-3-1-11(2-4-12)13(17)15-5-6-16-7-9-18-10-8-16/h1-4H,5-10H2,(H,15,17); Key:YHXISWVBGDMDLQ-UHFFFAOYSA-N

Moclobemide, sold under the brand names Amira, Aurorix, Clobemix, Depnil and Manerix among others, is a reversible inhibitor of monoamine oxidase A (RIMA) drug primarily used to treat depression and social anxiety. It is not approved for use in the United States, but is approved in other Western countries such as Canada, the United Kingdom and Australia. It is produced by affiliates of the Hoffmann–La Roche pharmaceutical company. Initially, Aurorix was also marketed by Roche in South Africa, but was withdrawn after its patent rights expired and Cipla Medpro's Depnil and Pharma Dynamic's Clorix became available at half the cost.

Moclobemide differs from the classic monoamine oxidase inhibitors (MAOIs) in that it selectively and reversibly inhibits monoamine oxidase A. Its interaction with dietary tyramine is consequently weaker and shorter-lived; special dietary restrictions are generally not required at standard therapeutic doses, although prescribing information advises avoiding large amounts of tyramine-rich foods. With classic MAOIs, a tyramine-restricted diet remains recommended because excessive tyramine can provoke a hypertensive reaction; however, modern food-production standards have reduced tyramine levels in most foods, and contemporary guidance focuses on a relatively small number of higher-risk foods. Moclobemide nevertheless has clinically important interactions with some serotonergic and sympathomimetic drugs.

Moclobemide was first introduced for medical use in 1989.

== Medical uses ==
=== Psychiatric disorders ===
Reversible selective MAOIs such as moclobemide are underprescribed due to the misconception that the side effect profiles are analogous to that of the irreversible and non-selective MAOIs. MAOIs such as moclobemide are reported to have a relatively fast onset of action compared to other antidepressant drug classes, and have good long-term tolerability in terms of side effects.

Tolerance does not seem to occur; research has found that moclobemide retains its beneficial therapeutic properties in depression for at least a year.

- Unipolar depression – Moclobemide has demonstrated effectiveness and efficacy in the treatment and management of major depressive disorder, with both endogenous and non-endogenous depression responding; in addition moclobemide has a fast onset of action compared to other antidepressants and is significantly more tolerable than the tricyclic antidepressants. Due to a good safety profile and low incidence of side effects moclobemide is likely to have a high level of acceptability by individuals suffering from depression. Higher doses (>450 mg/day) may be more effective in severe depression, while patients treated with a lower dose tend to respond less well than those treated with tricyclic antidepressants.

Psychotic depression, unipolar endogenous depression, melancholic depression, retarded depression, agitated depression and neurotic depression all respond to moclobemide, as does atypical depression. Unipolar endogenous depression is reported to have the best response to moclobemide therapy. Individuals suffering from depression who are given moclobemide are twice as likely to improve on moclobemide than on placebo. A concern of antidepressant adverse effects is sexual dysfunction; however, moclobemide has been found to actually increase libido and improve impaired erection, ejaculation and orgasm. Cardiovascular toxicity is a concern with antidepressants such as tricyclic antidepressants as well as the irreversible MAOIs; when cardiovascular toxicity is a concern, SSRIs or the reversible MAOIs such as moclobemide are an option as they lack or have a significantly reduced level of cardiovascular toxicity in terms of adverse effect as well as in overdose.

The effectiveness of moclobemide in agitated depression is equivalent to that of imipramine and sedative antidepressants such as amitriptyline, mianserin and maprotiline. The therapeutic response in agitated depressive individuals is similar to that seen in non-agitated depression; however, a past history of use of antidepressants reduces the chance of successful therapeutic response. The addition of a benzodiazepine to moclobemide therapy has not been found to be of benefit in this population group. Moclobemide has better tolerability compared to TCAs.

- Dysthymia – moclobemide has been found to be effective in the treatment and management of this depressive disorder.
- Social phobia – Moclobemide has been found to be effective for the treatment of social anxiety disorder in both short and long-term placebo controlled clinical trials. Moclobemide is effective but not as effective as the irreversible MAOIs in the treatment of social phobia. Maximal benefits can take 8–12 weeks to manifest. There is a high risk of treatment failure if there is co-morbid alcohol use disorder, however. The Australian Medicines Handbook lists social phobia as an accepted but not a licensed indication. The use of moclobemide in the treatment of social anxiety disorder has given mixed results with a tendency of response at higher doses (>300 mg/d) compared with placebo.
- Smoking cessation – Moclobemide has been tested in heavy dependent smokers against placebo based on the theory that tobacco smoking could be a form of self-medicating of major depression, and moclobemide could therefore help increase abstinence rates due to moclobemide mimicking the MAO-A inhibiting effects of tobacco smoke. A 2023 Cochrane review found only one 1995 trial studying the effects of moclobemide on smoking cessation, it was administered for 3 months and then stopped; at 6 months follow-up it was found those who had taken moclobemide for 3 months had a much higher successful quit rate than those in the placebo group. However, at 12-month follow-up the difference between the placebo group and the moclobemide group was no longer significant.
- Panic disorder – moclobemide is useful in the treatment and management of panic disorder. Panic disorder is mentioned as an accepted but unlicensed indication in the Australian Medicines Handbook.
- ADHD – Two small studies assessing the benefit of moclobemide in people with attention deficit disorder found that moclobemide produced favourable results.
- Fibromyalgia – moclobemide has been found to improve pain and functioning in this group of people.

Similar to other MAOIs, reversible MAOIs such as moclobemide may also be effective in a range of other psychiatric disorders. Menopausal flushing may also respond to moclobemide.

In efficacy studies for the treatment of major depressive disorder, moclobemide has been found to be significantly more effective than placebo, as effective as the tricyclic antidepressants (TCAs) and selective serotonin reuptake inhibitors (SSRIs), and somewhat less effective than the older, irreversible MAOIs phenelzine and tranylcypromine. In terms of tolerability, however, moclobemide was found to be comparable to the SSRIs and better tolerated than the TCAs and older MAOIs. There is some evidence that moclobemide on its own or in combination with other antidepressants such as SSRIs is also effective for treatment resistant depression and that the combination can be administered without the development of serotonin syndrome; however, further research is needed before such a combination can be recommended. Follow-up studies show that ongoing use of antidepressants leads to continuing improvement in depression over time; and also have demonstrated that moclobemide retains its therapeutic efficacy as an antidepressant for at least a year. This long-term efficacy is equivalent to that seen with other antidepressant classes.

People on irreversible MAOIs have to discontinue these antidepressants two weeks before general anesthesia, however, the use of moclobemide, due to its reversible nature, would allow such patients to possibly continue antidepressant therapy.

A dexamethasone suppression test (DST) and plasma and urine methoxyhydroxyphenylglycol (MHPG) test can be used to estimate who is likely to respond to moclobemide antidepressant therapy.

=== Combination with psychedelics ===
Moclobemide has been used as a component of "pharmahuasca" (pharmaceutical ayahuasca), in which the serotonergic psychedelic dimethyltryptamine (DMT) is combined with a synthetically produced or pharmaceutical monoamine oxidase inhibitor (MAOI) rather than with naturally sourced harmala alkaloids. This inhibits the metabolism of DMT and allows it to become orally active and to have a much longer duration than it would otherwise.

=== Special populations ===
==== Pregnancy and lactation ====
The doses of moclobemide in breast milk are very low (0.06% of moclobemide being recovered in breast milk) and therefore it has been concluded that moclobemide is unlikely to have any adverse effect on a suckling baby.

==== Children ====
Use in children is not recommended as there is insufficient data to assess safety and efficacy in these patients.

==== Elderly ====
Reversible MAOIs such as moclobemide may have advantages in the treatment of depression associated with Alzheimer's disease due to its effect on noradrenaline. Cognitive impairments have been found to improve in people with dementia when depression is treated with moclobemide. Due to its superior safety profile, moclobemide has been recommended as a first line agent for the treatment of depression in the elderly. Due to the side effect profile of moclobemide, it may be a better option for this sub group of people than other antidepressants. Research has found evidence that moclobemide may be able to counter anti-cholinergic (Scopolamine) induced cognitive impairments thus making moclobemide a good choice in the depression in the elderly and those with dementia.

== Contraindications ==
Avoid use in:

- Confusional states
- Phaeochromocytoma

and caution is recommended in:

- Agitated/excited patients
- Thyrotoxicosis

== Adverse effects ==
The incidence of adverse events is not correlated with age; however, adverse events occur more often in females than in males. Moclobemide is regarded as a generally safe antidepressant and due to its favorable side effect profile, it can be considered a first-line therapeutic antidepressant. The rate of incidence of side effects of moclobemide is low, with insomnia, headache and dizziness being the most commonly reported side effects in the initial stages of therapy with moclobemide. Moclobemide, even at high doses of 600 mg, does not impair the ability to drive a motor vehicle. The tolerability of moclobemide is similar in women and men and it is also well tolerated in the elderly. Moclobemide has been found to be superior to tricyclic and irreversible MAOI antidepressants in terms of side effects, as it does not cause anticholinergic, sedative or cardiovascular adverse effects.

Unlike the irreversible MAOIs there is no evidence of liver toxicity with moclobemide. Moclobemide has a similar efficacy profile compared to other antidepressants while being superior to the classic MAOIs and the tricyclics in terms of tolerance and safety profile. Moclobemide has little effect on psychomotor functions. Other side effects include nausea, insomnia, tremor and lightheadedness; orthostatic hypotension (dizziness upon standing) is uncommon even among the elderly. Behavioural toxicity or other impairments relating to everyday living does not occur with moclobemide, except that in doses of 400 mg or higher peripheral reaction time may be impaired. Peripheral oedema has been associated with moclobemide.

Some of the side effects are transient and disappear within 2 weeks of treatment. Serious fatigue, headache, restlessness, nervousness and sleep disturbances have been described as side effects from moclobemide therapy. A paradoxical worsening of depression has been reported in some individuals in several studies, and reports of suicide or suicidal ideation have been reported as a rare adverse effect of moclobemide. Overall, antidepressants decrease the risk of suicide. Moclobemide is believed to have only small proconvulsant effects; however, rarely seizures may occur. Hypertension has been reported to occur very rarely with moclobemide therapy.

Moclobemide is relatively well tolerated. The following are the potential adverse effects and their respective incidences:

Common (>1% incidence) adverse effects

- Nausea
- Dry mouth
- Constipation
- Diarrhea
- Insomnia
- Dizziness
- Anxiety
- Restlessness

Uncommon/Rare (<1%) adverse effects

- Difficulties falling asleep
- Nightmares and vivid dreams
- Hallucinations
- Memory disturbances
- Confusion
- Disorientation
- Delusions
- Increased depression
- Excitation/irritability
- Hypomania
- Mania
- Aggressive behaviour
- Apathy
- Tension
- Suicidal ideation
- Suicidal behaviour
- Migraine
- Extrapyramidal effects
- Tinnitus
- Paraesthesia
- Dysarthria
- Heartburn
- Gastritis
- Tympany
- Indigestion
- Hypertension
- Bradycardia
- Extrasystoles
- Angina/chest pain
- Phlebetic symptoms
- Flushing
- Exanthema/rash
- Allergic skin reaction
- Itching
- Gingivitis
- Stomatitis
- Dry skin
- Conjunctivitis
- Pruritus
- Urticaria
- Disturbances of micturition (dysuria, polyuria, tenesmus)
- Metrorrhagia
- Prolonged menstruation
- General malaise
- Skeletal/muscular pain
- Altered taste sensations
- Hot flushes/cold sensation
- Photopsia
- Dyspnoea
- Visual disturbances
- Increased hepatic enzymes without associated clinical sequelae.

=== Tolerance and withdrawal ===
Withdrawal symptoms appear to be very rare with moclobemide compared to other antidepressants; a single report of relatively mild flu-like symptoms persisting for 7 days after rapid reduction of high dose moclobemide therapy has been reported in one patient. Withdrawal of moclobemide causes a rebound in REM sleep.

Moclobemide does not seem to prevent withdrawal symptoms from serotonin reuptake inhibitors.

Discontinuation of moclobemide is recommended to be done gradually to minimise side effects (e.g. rapid return of condition being treated and/or the appearance of withdrawal symptoms). Tolerance to the therapeutic effects has been reported in a small number of users of MAOIs including moclobemide.

== Overdose ==
Moclobemide is considered to be less toxic in overdose compared to older antidepressants, such as the tricyclic antidepressants and the irreversible and non-selective MAOIs, making it a safer antidepressant in the elderly or people with physical disorders. Of 18 people who overdosed on moclobemide during clinical trials, all recovered fully and moclobemide was judged to be safe for inpatient as well as outpatient use. Intoxications with moclobemide as single agent are usually mild; however, when combined with tricyclic or SSRI antidepressants the overdose is much more toxic and potentially fatal. Moclobemide, is preferred by doctors for patients who are at risk of suicide, due to moclobemide's low toxicity in overdose. Patients with mixed intoxications (e.g. with other CNS active drugs) may show severe or life-threatening symptoms and should be hospitalized. Treatment is largely symptomatic and should be aimed at maintenance of the vital functions.

=== Preclinical toxicology ===
- Acute toxicity: The oral LD_{50} values in mouse and rat are quite high, indicating a wide therapeutic index. LD_{50} for mice is 730 mg/kg and for rats 1,300 mg/kg. In dogs doses in excess of 300 mg/kg led to vomiting, salivation, ataxia, and drowsiness.
- Chronic toxicity: In an 18-months-study in rats with 10 mg/kg no signs of chronic toxicity were noted, with 50 mg/kg and 250 mg/kg only a slight loss of weight, and with 250 mg/kg mildly elevated Alkaline phosphatase and Gamma-GT. Studies in dogs revealed no toxicity relevant for humans. No evidence for a possible hepatic or cardiovascular toxicity was found.

== Interactions ==
Moclobemide has fewer interactions than irreversible MAOIs. Cimetidine, however, causes a significant rise in moclobemide levels and therefore if the combination is used, lower doses of moclobemide have been recommended. There is little increase in the effects of alcohol when combined with moclobemide and, in fact, moclobemide causes a reduction in alcohol-related impairments. Moclobemide also interacts with pethidine/meperidine, and dextropropoxyphene. Ephedrine in combination with moclobemide increases the risk of cardiovascular adverse effects. Moclobemide is also likely to interact with warfarin. The combination of moclobemide with prescription or over the counter sympathomimetic drugs is not recommended due to the potential of significant drug interactions.

Serotonin syndrome has been reported when moclobemide has been taken in combination with other serotonin enhancing drugs; however, due to moclobemide's reversible MAO inhibition, serotonin syndrome is significantly less likely to occur with moclobemide than with older irreversible MAOIs. Serotonin syndrome has been reported when trazodone was abruptly replaced with moclobemide. Taking at the same time or starting moclobemide too soon after discontinuing serotonin reuptake inhibitors (SRIs) such as selective serotonin reuptake inhibitors (SSRIs) or clomipramine may result in the development of a serotonin syndrome. Serotonin–norepinephrine reuptake inhibitors (SNRIs) such as venlafaxine in combination with moclobemide have also been associated with serotonin syndrome. Cimetidine causes a doubling of the blood plasma levels of moclobemide. Blood plasma levels of trimipramine and maprotiline and possibly other tricyclic antidepressants increase when used in combination with moclobemide and may require dosage adjustments if the combination is used for treatment resistant depression. The elimination of zolmitriptan is reduced by moclobemide and if the combination is used, a dose reduction of zolmitriptan is recommended. Moclobemide reduces the metabolism of dextromethorphan. Moclobemide may decrease metabolism of diazepam, omeprazole, proguanil, propranolol and others due to inhibition of CYP2C19.

=== Dietary interactions ===
Irreversible MAOIs can cause unpleasant and occasionally dangerous side effects such as a hypertensive crises after intake of food or drink containing indirectly acting sympathomimetic amines such as tyramine. This is sometimes referred to as the 'cheese effect'. These side effects are due to irreversible inhibition of MAO in the gut and vasomotor neurons. However, the reversible MAOI antidepressants such as moclobemide have a very different side effect profile in this regard. The reversible binding to MAO-A by moclobemide allows amines such as tyramine to displace moclobemide from MAO-A allowing its metabolism and removing the risk of a hypertensive crisis that occurs with irreversible MAO inhibition. Of 2300 people in multiple clinical trials who were treated with moclobemide in doses up to 600 mg with no dietary restrictions, none experienced a tyramine-mediated hypertensive reaction. As the pressor effect of moclobemide is so low, dietary restrictions are not necessary in people eating a normal diet, in contrast to irreversible MAOIs. However, some rare cheeses that have a high tyramine level may possibly cause a pressor effect and require caution. The potentiation of the pressor effect of tyramine by moclobemide is only one seventh to one tenth of that of irreversible MAOIs. In order to minimize this potentiation, postprandial administration (taken after meals) of moclobemide is recommended. The combined use of moclobemide and selegiline requires dietary restrictions as the combination can lead to increased sensitivity to the pressor effect of foods containing tyramine.

While moclobemide or the irreversible MAO-B selective inhibitor selegiline taken alone has very little pressor effect, and requires no dietary restriction, the combination of selegiline with moclobemide leads to a significant enhancement of the pressor effect and such a combination requires dietary restriction of foods containing high amounts of tyramine. The combination of moclobemide and a reversible MAO-B inhibitor requires tyramine dietary restrictions.

== Pharmacology ==
=== Pharmacodynamics ===
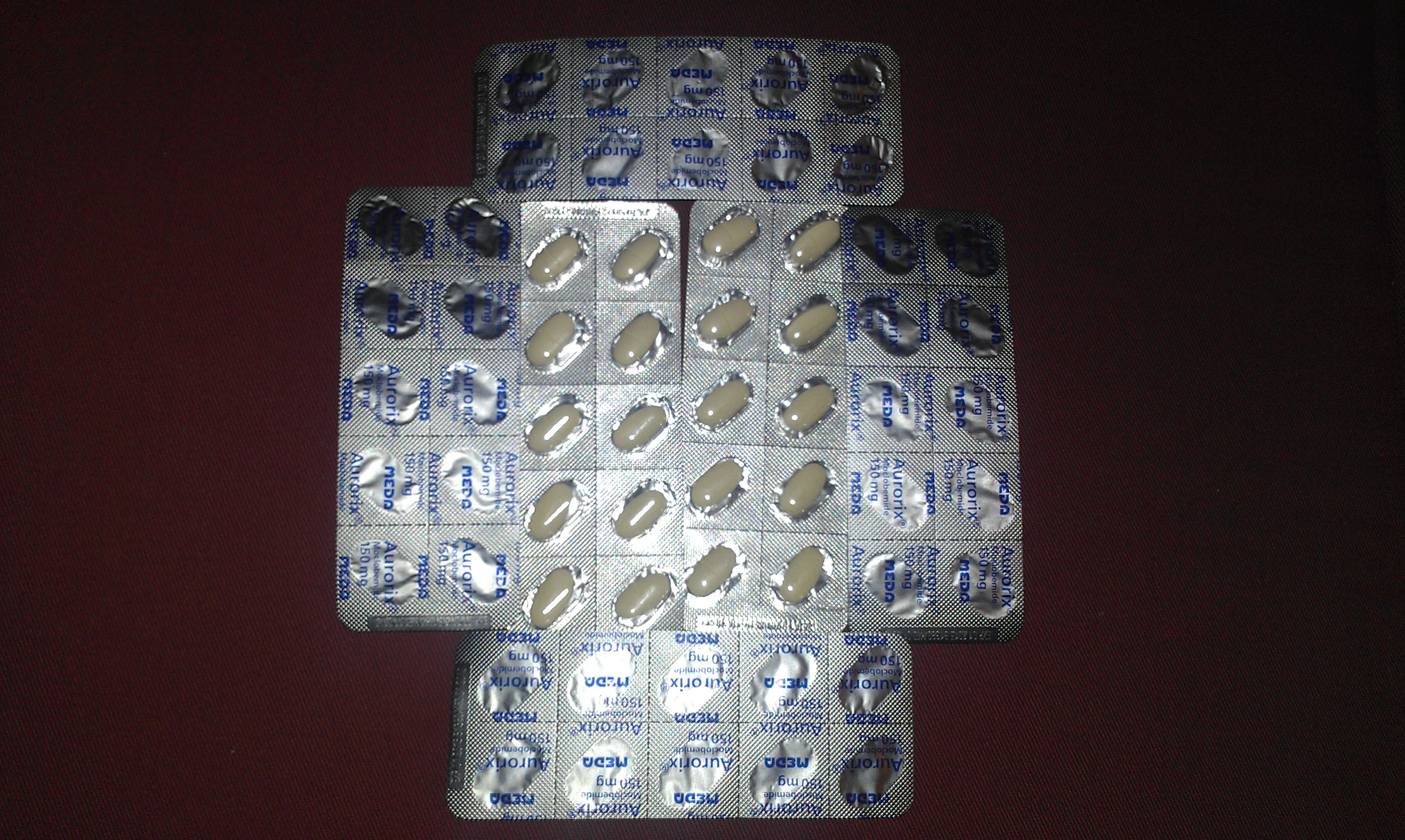
A picture of 150 mg tablets of the reversible MAOI drug moclobemide, brand name Aurorix.

Moclobemide is a benzamide, derivative of morpholine, which acts pharmacologically as a selective, reversible inhibitor of monoamine oxidase-A (RIMA), a type of monoamine oxidase inhibitor (MAOI), and increases levels of norepinephrine (noradrenaline), dopamine, and especially serotonin in neuronal cells as well as in synaptic vesicles; extracellular levels also increase which results in increased monoamine receptor stimulation and suppression of REM sleep, down regulation of beta-3 adrenergic receptors. Moclobemide's primary action is to disable MAO-A enzymes from decomposing norepinephrine, serotonin, and dopamine which results in a rising level of these neurotransmitters. Although it has been estimated that a single 300 mg dose of moclobemide inhibits 80% of monoamine oxidase-A (MAO-A) and 20-30% of MAO-B, studies evaluating brain occupancy of MAO-A enzymes have shown dosages of 600 mg to only inhibit 74% of MAO-A enzymes and dosages in the 900–1200 mg range to inhibit slightly less MAO-A than phenelzine (Nardil) at 45–60 mg; subsequently, it is highly plausible that reports of lower efficacy could be largely or entirely the consequence of conservative dosage guidelines rather than the pharmacological properties of the drug. Previously, it was widely reported that both MAO-A and MAO-B enzymes were responsible for the metabolism of dopamine; however, new research suggests that MAO-B enzymes are involved in the generation of GABA and not the degradation of dopamine. There is also some evidence of moclobemide possessing neuroprotective properties in rodent models. There is no cumulative effect of moclobemide centrally when taken long-term. With long-term use of moclobemide, there is a significant down-regulation of B-adrenoceptors. Single or repeated dosing with 100–300 mg of moclobemide leads to a reduction in deaminated metabolites of amines such as 3,4-dihydroxyphenylacetic acid, 3,4-dihydroxyphenylethylglycol as well as 5-HIAA. Excretion of homovanillic acid and vanillylmandelic acid via urine is also reduced. There is also a temporary increase in prolactin during initial intake of 100–300 mg of moclobemide. L-dihydroxyphenylalanine is also reduced. Inhibition of the serotonin metabolite is less pronounced than the norepinephrine metabolite which suggests there are other major metabolic pathways for serotonin other than MAO-A.

It has been described as a 'slow binding inhibitor', whereby conformational changes to either moclobemide or the enzyme to MAO-A slowly form a more tightly bound complex, resulting in the non-competitive MAO inhibition by moclobemide. With three times daily dosing the inhibition on MAO-A was relatively constant with moclobemide. The MAO inhibition of moclobemide lasts about 8–10 hours and wears off completely by 24 hours after dosing. The inhibition of MAO-A by moclobemide is 10 times more potent than the irreversible MAOI phenelzine and approximately equivalent to tranylcypromine and isocarboxazid.

Moclobemide increases levels of extracellular monoamines and decreases levels of their metabolites in rat brains; tolerance to these effects does not seem to occur with chronic use of moclobemide. Moclobemide lacks anticholinergic effects and cognitive impairments can be improved by moclobemide. Moclobemide suppresses the unstimulated release of certain proinflammatory cytokines which are believed to be involved in the pathophysiology of major depression and stimulates the release of anti-inflammatory cytokines. Long-term treatment with moclobemide leads to an increase in cyclic adenosine monophosphate (cAMP) binding to cAMP-dependent protein kinase (PKA).

Moclobemide is chemically unrelated to irreversible MAOI antidepressants and only has a very weak pressor effect of orally administered tyramine. In humans, the n-oxide metabolites of moclobemide and moclobemide itself are the compounds that produce most of the inhibition of MAO-A; other metabolites are significantly less potent than the parent compound.

In healthy people moclobemide has a relatively small suppressing effect on REM sleep; in contrast, depressed people who have been treated with moclobemide, progressively show improved sleep over a 4-week period, with an increase in stage 2 non-rapid eye movement (NREM) sleep and rapid eye movement (REM) sleep. There have been conflicting findings with regard to moclobemide altering cortisol levels and whether moclobemide increases growth hormone levels. Testosterone levels increase significantly with long-term use of moclobemide in depressed males.

Moclobemide also has neuroprotective properties in its demonstrated anti-hypoxia or anti-ischemia effects; there is a possibility that moclobemide may possess similar neuro-rescuing properties, similar to selegiline, however, research is required to determine this. Moclobemide has also been demonstrated in a single dose research study to possess antinociceptive properties.

Platelet MAO is of the MAO-B and this is inhibited only to a small degree in humans; the inhibition is due to low levels of metabolites of moclobemide that have MAO-B inhibiting properties. Moclobemide has been reported to be a mixed MAO-A/MAO-B inhibitor in rats but in man, it has been reported to be a pure MAO-A inhibitor, blocking the decomposition of norepinephrine, serotonin and, to a lesser extent, dopamine. No reuptake inhibition of any of the neurotransmitters occurs. The pharmacodynamic action encompasses activation, elevation of mood, and improvement of symptoms like dysphoria, fatigue, and difficulties in concentration. The duration and quality of sleep may be improved. In the treatment of depression the antidepressant effect often becomes evident in the first week of therapy (earlier than typically noted with TCAs/SSRIs).

MAO activity returns completely back to normal after 24 hours of the last dose, which allows for a quick switch to another antidepressant after the 24 hours.

=== Pharmacokinetics ===
In humans moclobemide is rapidly and almost completely absorbed and totally metabolised via the liver. Peak plasma levels occur 0.3 to 2 hours after oral administration. The bioavailability increases during the first week of therapy from 60% to 80% and more. The elimination half-life is around 2 hours. It is moderately bound to plasma proteins, especially albumin. However, the short disposition half-life somewhat increases after repeated dosing; moclobemide has an intermediate elimination half-life for systemic clearance and an intermediate volume of distribution. Despite its short half-life the pharmacodynamic action of a single dose persists for approximately 16 hours. The drug is almost completely metabolized in the liver; it is a substrate of CYP2C19 and an inhibitor of CYP2C19, CYP2D6 and CYP1A2. Less than 1 percent of the drug is excreted unchanged; 92 percent of the metabolised drug is excreted within the first 12 hours. The main metabolites are the N-oxide Ro 12-5637 formed via morpholine N-oxidation and lactam derivative Ro 12-8095 formed via morpholine C-oxidation; active metabolites are found only in trace amounts. The unchanged drug (less than 1%) as well as the metabolites are excreted renally (in urine). The main degradation pathway of moclobemide is oxidation. About 44 percent of the drug is lost due to the first pass effect through the liver. Age and renal function do not affect the pharmacokinetics of moclobemide. However, patients with significantly reduced liver function require dose reductions due to the significant slowing of metabolism of moclobemide. Food slows the absorption but does not affect the bioavailability of moclobemide.

Steady state concentrations are established after one week. It has been suggested that changes in dose should not be made with a gap of less than a week. Moclobemide has good penetration across the blood brain barrier with peak plasma levels within the central nervous system occurring 2 hours after administration.

== History ==
Irreversible MAOI antidepressants were discovered accidentally in the 1950s but their popularity declined as their toxicity especially their dangerous food interactions became apparent and rival tricyclic antidepressants were discovered. Reversible MAOIs were developed in the hope that they would exert efficacy in depressive disorders but with less of the toxicity of the older irreversible compounds; moclobemide's discovery and marketing brought the renewed interest in MAOIs due to an absence of dangerous tyramine food interactions and potent antidepressant effects. In 1992 moclobemide was launched onto the world markets. Moclobemide was the first reversible MAO-A inhibitor to be widely marketed. Moclobemide as well as other newer antidepressants such as the SSRIs led to changes in prescribing patterns and broadened the treatment options for the management of depressive disorders.

When moclobemide was discovered in 1972 in Switzerland, it was first hypothesized as being an antilipaemic or antibiotic, but the screenings were negative. The search for its antidepressant qualities, based on anticholinergic tests, also proved negative and moclobemide was then suspected of being an antipsychotic before its specific and reversible MAO-A inhibition qualities were detected. After the establishment of its lack of relevant interference with tyramine pressure response, clinical trials were launched in 1977 and further trials confirmed the broad antidepressant activity of RIMAs. It was first approved in Sweden in 1989 and then the United Kingdom and Europe as the first reversible and selective inhibitor of MAO-A and is now approved in over 50 countries worldwide. The Australian TGA approved moclobemide in December 2000. Subsequent research found that moclobemide is well tolerated in elderly patients and far superior to tricyclic antidepressants in terms of side effects, tolerability and overdose. With regard to effectiveness in the treatment of depression, moclobemide was determined to be as effective as all major antidepressant drug classes. There is no need for dietary restrictions in contrast to people on irreversible MAOIs and apart from an important interaction with other serotonergic enhancing agents such as SSRIs and pethidine, there are few serious drug interactions and because of these benefits, moclobemide became regarded as a beneficial addition to medical 'prescribing arsenal'. Additionally moclobemide was found, unlike most other antidepressants on the market, to actually improve all aspects of sexual function. It is the only reversible MAOI in use in clinical practice. The fact that moclobemide's pharmacokinetic properties are unaltered by age, that cognition is improved in the elderly, and moclobemide has low potential for food and drug interactions opened up a new avenue for the treatment of major depressive disorder. In 2016 moclobemide was discontinued in Brazil for commercial reasons.

== Society and culture ==
=== Brand names ===
It is sold under many trade names worldwide. These include Apo-Moclob, Apo-Moclobemide, Auromid, Aurorix, Bei Su, Biorix, Depnil, Eutac, Hai Bei Lin, Langtian, Manerix, Mobemid, Moclamine, Moclo A, Moclobemid - 1 A Pharma, Moclobemid AL, Moclobemid HEXAL, Moclobemid ratiopharm, Moclobemida, Moclobemida Genedec, Moclobemida Teva, Moclobemide Actavis, Moclobemide Aurobindo, Moclobemide CF, Moclobemide Mylan, Moclobemide Sandoz, Moclobemide Sopharma, Moclobemide Teva, Moclobemid-neuraxpharm, Moclobemid-ratiopharm, Moclobeta, Moclod, moclodura, Moclostad, Mocrim, Moklar, Teva-Moclobemide, Tian Tai, Ya Zheng, and Zorix.

== See also ==
- List of antidepressants
- Monoamine oxidase inhibitor
- Brofaromine
