= C9H12O4 =

The molecular formula C_{9}H_{12}O_{4} (molar mass: 184.18 g/mol) may refer to:

- 3-Methoxy-4-hydroxyphenylglycol
- 3-(cis-5,6-Dihydroxycyclohexa-1,3-dien-1-yl)propanoic acid
