= Masked depression =

Proposed form of clinical depression

Masked depression (MD) is a now mainly historical term, that was essentially a form of atypical depression in which somatic symptoms or behavioural disturbances dominate the clinical picture and disguise the underlying affective disorder. The term is no longer used in psychiatry in the United States or most other Western countries, where a more standardized somatic symptom disorder is preferred.

== Clinical manifestations ==
Somatic manifestations of MD are distinguished by an extreme diversity and include headaches, back pain, abdominal pain etc. Pathological behaviour masking depression may take the form of compulsive gambling, compulsive work, changes in arousal or orgasmic function, decreased libido or, on the contrary, impulsive sexual behaviour, alcoholism, or drug addiction.

Chronic pain is more often noted as a connection to MD by non-psychiatrists than psychiatrists, while lack of concentration is often noted by psychiatrists.

== Dispute about the concept ==
MD has been variously described as "depression equivalent, a vegetative equivalent, a depression without a depression, and a hidden depression." Most investigators, especially those in the German-speaking countries, assumed masked depression (German: die larvierte Depression) to be a form of endogenous depression. The term was largely used in the 1970s and 1980s, but at the end of the 20th century there was a decline in interest in the study of masked depression. Today this diagnosis is rarely, if ever, used.

== Epidemiology ==
MD was thought to be a common clinical phenomenon. According to some authors, masked depression is as frequent as overt depression. Although masked depression can be found at any age, it has been observed more commonly after mid-life.

Making the diagnosis and the management of MD in clinical practice are complicated by the fact that he who has got MD is unaware of his mental illness. Patients with MD are reluctant to associate their physical symptoms with an affective disorder and refuse mental health care. As a rule, these patients attribute their disturbances to physical illness, seek medical care for them, and report only somatic complaints to their physicians, with the consequence that many of such depressions are not recognized or are misdiagnosed and mistreated Estimates of depressed patients who are correctly identified and treated range from 5% to 60%. Data show that about 10% of people who consult a physician for any reason, originally has affective disorders disguised by physical symptoms.

== Official diagnostic status ==
Current classifications: ICD-10 and DSM-5 do not contain the term "masked depression". Some Ukrainian psychiatrists claim that MD is to be qualified as "depression with somatic symptoms" in the ICD-10 (F 3x.01). This means that those who struggle with masked depression often have more physical symptoms such as back pain, abdominal pain, headaches, and even pain during sexual activity or painful periods. For those with more clinical depression, while they still may have physical symptoms, their symptoms are usually more mental or emotional. This includes feelings of helplessness, extreme and/or persisting sadness, numbness, tiredness, drowsiness, exhaustion, and even suicidal thoughts or feelings.

== Diagnostic criteria ==
Affective disorders in patients with MD can only be detected by means of a clinician-administered diagnostic interview. Organic exclusion rules and other criteria are used in making the diagnosis of MD. Some physical symptoms of masked depression include general aches, pains including headache, backache, musculoskeletal aches, and other non-painful symptoms such as changes in appetite and libido, lack of energy, sleep disturbance, dizziness, palpitations, dyspnea, and gastrointestinal tract disturbances. Some of the main recorded symptoms of MD are insomnia, a general lack of interest in normal activities, headache, anorexia, and fatigue in that order.

== See also ==
- Somatisation
- Somatoform disorder
