= 3-(cis-5,6-Dihydroxycyclohexa-1,3-dien-1-yl)propanoic acid =

3-(cis-5,6-Dihydroxycyclohexa-1,3-dienyl)propanic acid

Names
- IUPAC name 3-(cis-5,6-dihydroxycyclohexa-1,3-dien-1-yl)propanoic acid
- Systematic IUPAC name 3-[(5,6-Dihydroxycyclohexa-1,3-dien-1-yl)]propanoic acid

Identifiers
3D model (JSmol)	Anion: Interactive image; Acid: Interactive image
ChEBI	Anion: CHEBI:60089; Acid: CHEBI:10472
ChemSpider	Anion: 26331810; Acid: 391536
KEGG	Acid: C11588
PubChem CID	Anion: 46878520; Acid: 443290
- InChI: InChI=1S/C9H12O4/c10-7-3-1-2-6(9(7)13)4-5-8(11)12/h1-3,7,9-10,13H,4-5H2,(H,11,12)/p-1/t7-,9+/m0/s1 Key: RKDFGWAXBBGKMR-IONNQARKSA-M; Acid: InChI=1S/C9H12O4/c10-7-3-1-2-6(9(7)13)4-5-8(11)12/h1-3,7,9-10,13H,4-5H2,(H,11,12)/t7-,9+/m0/s1 Key: RKDFGWAXBBGKMR-IONNQARKSA-N
- SMILES: Anion: O=C([O-])CCC1=CC=C[C@H](O)[C@@H]1O; Acid: C1=C[C@@H]([C@@H](C(=C1)CCC(=O)O)O)O

Properties
Chemical formula	C_{9}H_{12}O_{4}
Molar mass	184.191 g·mol^{−1}
- Except where otherwise noted, data are given for materials in their standard state (at 25 °C [77 °F], 100 kPa). Infobox references

3-(cis-5,6-Dihydroxycyclohexa-1,3-dien-1-yl)propanoic acid is an chemical with the formula C_{9}H_{12}O_{4}. The conjugate base is 3-(cis-5,6-dihydroxycyclohexa-1,3-dien-1-yl)propanoate.

It is a substrate of 3-(cis-5,6-dihydroxycyclohexa-1,3-dien-1-yl)propanoate dehydrogenase.
