= Ruth the Betrayer =

1862–1863 female detective story by Edward Ellis

Ruth the Betrayer; or, The Female Spy, by Edward Ellis was the first fictional female detective story. It was published as a penny dreadful in 52 parts in 1862-63 by John Dicks, and the British Library's single-volume compilation copy was acquired on 28 February 1863. It therefore predates Andrew Forrester's The Female Detective and W.S. Hayward's The Revelations of a Lady Detective, both of 1863/4.

Ruth Trail, the protagonist, is "a female detective – a sort of spy we use in the hanky-panky way when a man would be too clumsy".

== See also ==
- Barry Ono
- List of female detective characters
