= James Redding Ware =

James Redding Ware (1832 – c. 1909, pseudonym Andrew Forrester) was an English writer, novelist and playwright, creator of one of the first female detectives in fiction. His last known work was a dictionary.

== Early life ==
James Redding Ware was born in Southwark, South London, in 1832, the son of James Ware, a grocer, and Elizabeth, née Redding. By 1851, his father had died, and his mother, according to the census, was a grocer and tea-dealer, and James Redding Ware was her assistant. By 1861, the household was no longer in place, and J. R. Ware was not readily identifiable in the census. But in 1865, James Redding Ware became a Freemason, at the Westbourne Lodge No. 733, and he was living in Peckham. He became a Junior Warden at the Urban Lodge, no. 1196, and by 1872 a Worshipful Master (WM).

== Literary career ==
His detective works include: The Female Detective (c. 1863/1864), 'edited by A.F.'; Secret Service, or, Recollections of a City Detective (1864?); The Private Detective and Revelations of the Private Detective (both c. 1868).

"Forrester" was for many years known to be a pseudonym, but who he was actually was unknown. However, one of his stories, "A Child Found Dead: Murder or No Murder?", was discovered, reprinted as a pamphlet and published under the name of J. Redding Ware, as "The Road Murder", an analysis of the Constance Kent case. With this as a clue, Forrester/Ware's first stories of the female detective can be found in a journal entitled Grave and Gay in summer 1862. The character predates the 1863/1864 appearance of W. S. Hayward's The Revelations of a Lady Detective although not that of Ruth Trail.

In 1860 a novel, The Fortunes of the House of Pennyl. A Romance of England in the Last Century (Blackwood's London Library) was published, with illustrations by Phiz, under the name J. Redding Ware. By 1868, he was a contributor to the Boy's Own Paper, the series of penny-bloods owned by Edwin Brett, although no particular work has been attributed to him. He also contributed to Bow Bells Magazine.

Ware wrote The Death Trap, a play staged at the Grecian Saloon, City Road, Shoreditch, with George Conquest, the theatre manager, as the villain. He had now become a jobbing writer for hire, producing books on chess; a book on the Isle of Wight with photographs by William Russell Sedgefield and Frank Mason Good; a volume of The Life and Speeches of His Royal Highness Prince Leopold; Mistaken Identities. Celebrated Cases of Undeserved Suffering, Self-Deception, and Wilful Imposture; as well as writing extensively for magazines. His only seeming connection to his early days as a writer of detective stories was with the publication, possibly in 1880, of Before the Bench: Sketches of Police Court Life (London, Diprose & Bateman). Posthumously, he was most famous for Passing English of the Victorian Era. A Dictionary of Heterodox English Slang and Phrase (London, Routledge, 1909), published shortly after his death.

== Works ==
- The Fortunes of the House of Pennyl: A Romance of England in the Last Century (1860 as JR Ware)
- A Nice Quiet Cottage. A One-act Farce (1863)
- The Revelations of a Private Detective (1863)
- The female detective: [the original lady detective, 1864], London: British Library, 2012. ISBN 978-0-7123-5878-1 Reprint of the 1864 edition.
- The Road Murder. Analysis of this Persistent Mystery (1865)
- Tales by a Female Detective (1868)
- Opera Comique (1870)
- The Death Trap; Or a Cat's-Paw. A Drama in Four Acts (1870)
- The Modern Hoyle; Or, How to Play Whist - Chess - Cribbage - Dominoes - Draughts - Backgammon, and Besique (1870)
- The Isle of Wight (1871)
- Bothwell: A Drama in Four Acts (1871)
- Pipermans' Predicaments. A Farce, in One Act (1871)
- Bothwell. A Drama, in Four Acts (1871)
- The Meadows of St. Gervais. A Farce-comedy, in Two Acts (1871)
- One Snowy Night. A Comedy, in One Act (1871)
- In Quarantine. A Comedy, in One Act (1871)
- The Polish Jew: a drama in three acts (Emile Erckmann, Alexandre Chatrian, trans JR Ware 1872?)
- Before the Bench: Sketches of Police Court Life (1880)
- Some Social Science. A Satirical Comedy, in Three Acts (1880)
- Alpine Betrothals. A Swiss Eclogue, for Music (1880)
- Constant Woman: A Drawing-room Drama for Two and a Parlourmaid (1881)
- A Woman Will be a Woman. An Original Duologue (1883)
- Twenty and Forty. An Original Comedy (1883)
- Life and Speeches of His Royal Highness Prince Leopold (1884)
- Wonderful Dreams of Remarkable Men and Women (1884)
- Famous Centenarians (1886)
- Mistaken Identities: Celebrated Cases of Undeserved Suffering, Self-deception, and Wilful Imposture (1886)
- The Life and Times of Colonel Fred Burnaby (with RK Mann, 1886)
- Passing English of the Victorian Era: A Dictionary of Heterodox English Slang and Phrase (1909)

== See also ==
- Got the morbs
