= Brofaromine =

Chemical compound

Clinical data
- Routes of administration: Oral
- Drug class: Monoamine oxidase inhibitor (MAOI); Reversible inhibitor of MAO-A (RIMA)
- ATC code: None

Legal status
- Legal status: In general: ℞ (Prescription only)

Pharmacokinetic data
- Protein binding: 98%
- Elimination half-life: 9-14 hours

Identifiers
- IUPAC name: 4-(7-bromo-5-methoxybenzofuran-2-yl)piperidine
- CAS Number: 63638-91-5
- PubChem CID: 44571
- ChemSpider: 40549
- UNII: 6WV4B8Q07H
- KEGG: D02560
- ChEMBL: ChEMBL160347
- CompTox Dashboard (EPA): DTXSID10213008

Chemical and physical data
- Formula: C_{14}H_{16}BrNO_{2}
- Molar mass: 310.191 g·mol^{−1}
- 3D model (JSmol): Interactive image
- SMILES: Brc3cc(OC)cc1c3oc(c1)C2CCNCC2
- InChI: InChI=1S/C14H16BrNO2/c1-17-11-6-10-7-13(9-2-4-16-5-3-9)18-14(10)12(15)8-11/h6-9,16H,2-5H2,1H3; Key:WZXHSWVDAYOFPE-UHFFFAOYSA-N

Brofaromine (proposed brand name Consonar) is a reversible inhibitor of monoamine oxidase A (RIMA) discovered by Ciba-Geigy. The compound was primarily researched in the treatment of depression and anxiety but its development was dropped before it was brought to market.

Brofaromine also acts as a serotonin reuptake inhibitor, and its dual pharmacologic effects offered promise in the treatment of a wide spectrum of depressed patients while producing less severe anticholinergic side effects in comparison with older standard drugs like certain of the tricyclic antidepressants.

== Pharmacology ==
Brofaromine is a reversible inhibitor of monoamine oxidase A (RIMA, a type of monoamine oxidase inhibitor (MAOI)) and acts on epinephrine (adrenaline), norepinephrine (noradrenaline), serotonin, and dopamine. Unlike standard MAOIs, possible side effects do not include cardiovascular complications (hypertension) with encephalopathy, liver toxicity or hyperthermia.

== See also ==
- Moclobemide
