= Got the morbs =

Victorian slang phrase describing sadness

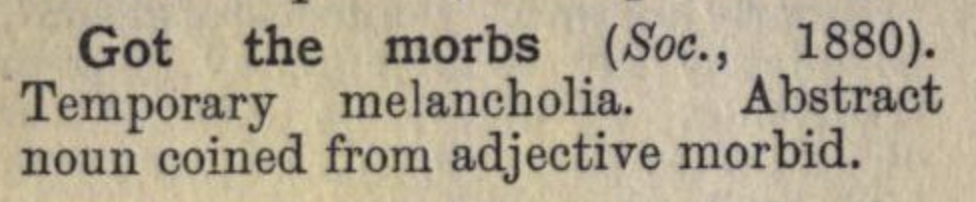
Dictionary definition for "got the morbs" in Passing English of the Victorian Era (1909)

"Got the morbs" is a slang phrase or euphemism used in the Victorian era. The phrase describes a person afflicted with temporary melancholy or sadness. The term was defined in James Redding Ware's 1909 book Passing English of the Victorian Era.

== Etymology and history ==
Morbs is a slang abstract noun that is derived from the adjective morbid. The word morbid came from the original Latin word morbidus, which meant 'sickly', 'diseased' or 'unwholesome'. The word also has roots in the Latin word morbus, which meant 'sorrow', 'grief', or 'distress of the mind'. The phrase appeared in the book Passing English of the Victorian Era (1909) by James Redding Ware. The book states that the phrase dates from 1880 and defines it: "Temporary melancholia. Abstract noun coined from adjective morbid." The British lexicographer Susie Dent described "having the morbs" as "to sit under a cloud of despondency".

== Popular culture ==
In 2015, the Boston-based indie rock band The Sheila Divine released a full-length album titled The Morbs. An all-girl band in Lincoln, Nebraska, named themselves The Morbs after the phrase.

== See also ==
- Depression in childhood and adolescence
- Depression (mood)
- Existential crisis
- Feeling
- Melancholia
- Mixed anxiety–depressive disorder
