= 3-(cis-5,6-dihydroxycyclohexa-1,3-dien-1-yl)propanoate dehydrogenase =

Class of enzymes

Identifiers
- EC no.: 1.3.1.87
- Alt. names: cis-dihydrodiol dehydrogenase, 2,3-dihydroxy-2,3-dihydro-phenylpropionate dehydrogenase

Databases
- IntEnz: IntEnz view
- BRENDA: BRENDA entry
- ExPASy: NiceZyme view
- KEGG: KEGG entry
- MetaCyc: metabolic pathway
- PRIAM: profile
- PDB structures: RCSB PDB PDBe PDBsum
Search
- PMC: articles
- PubMed: articles
- NCBI: proteins

3-(cis-5,6-dihydroxycyclohexa-1,3-dien-1-yl)propanoate dehydrogenase is an enzyme with systematic name 3-(cis-5,6-dihydroxycyclohexa-1,3-dien-1-yl)propanoate:NAD^{+} oxidoreductase. It is produced by the gene hcaB. This enzyme catalyses the following chemical reaction:

(1) 3-(cis-5,6-dihydroxycyclohexa-1,3-dien-1-yl)propanoate + NAD^{+} $\rightleftharpoons$ 3-(2,3-dihydroxyphenyl)propanoate + NADH + H^{+}
(2) (2E)-3-(cis-5,6-dihydroxycyclohexa-1,3-dien-1-yl)prop-2-enoate + NAD^{+} $\rightleftharpoons$ (2E)-3-(2,3-dihydroxyphenyl)prop-2-enoate + NADH + H^{+}

This enzyme catalyses a step in indegradation of phenylpropanoid compounds.
