= Melancholia =

Historical view of extreme depression

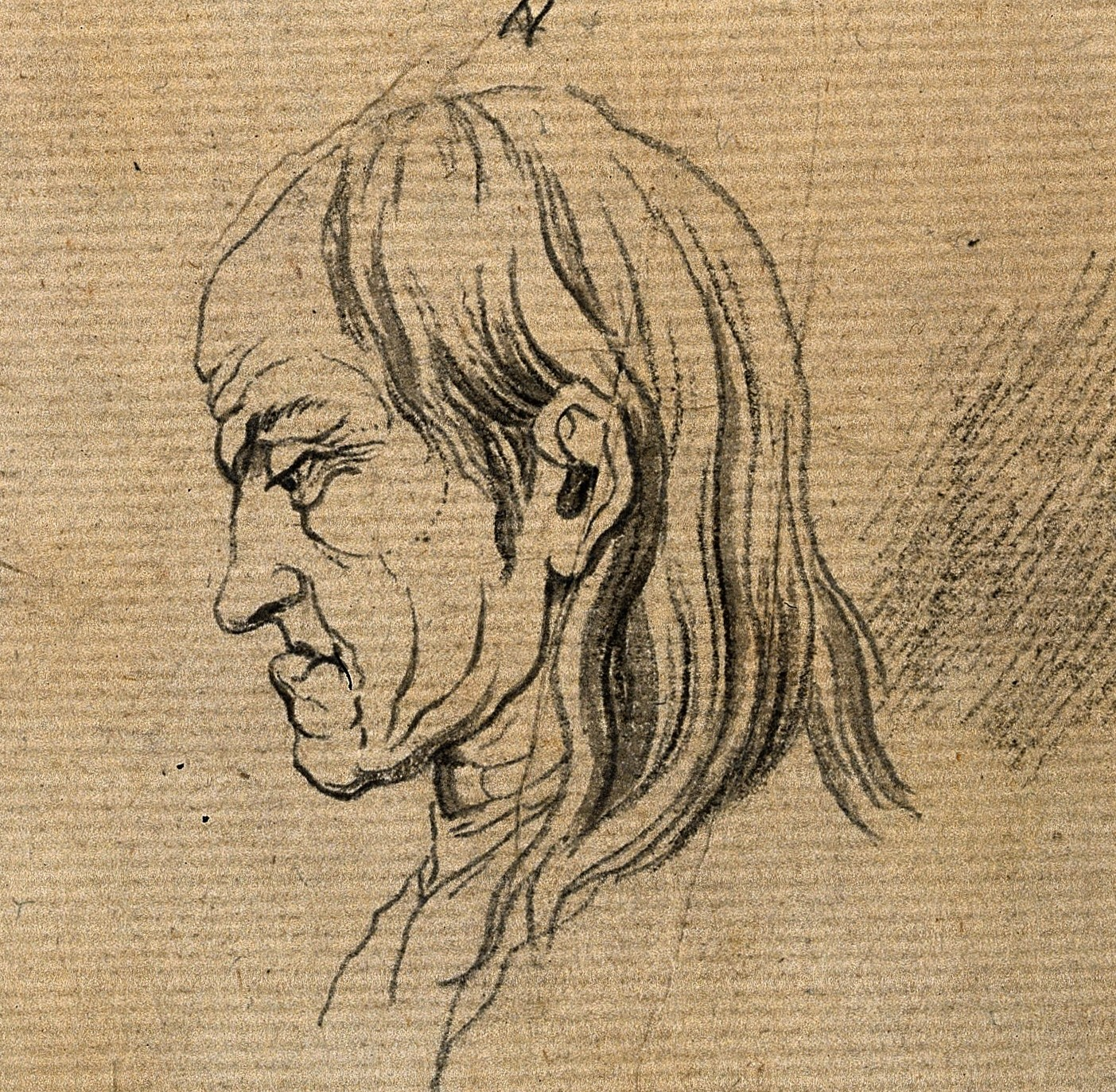
Physiognomy of the melancholic temperament (drawing by Thomas Holloway made for Johann Kaspar Lavater's Essays on Physiognomy, c. 1789)

Melancholia or melancholy (Ancient Greek: μελαγχολία, romanized: melancholía; from μέλαινα χολή, mélaina cholḗ, 'black bile') is a concept found throughout ancient, medieval, and premodern medicine in Europe that describes a condition characterized by markedly depressed mood, bodily complaints, and sometimes hallucinations and delusions. Besides a pathological condition, melancholy could also refer to a mood or temperament and at times it was even used as a description of the human condition in general.

Melancholy (or more precisely the 'black bile', from which melancholy derives its name) was regarded as one of the four temperaments matching the four humours. Until the 18th century, doctors and other scholars classified melancholic conditions as such by their perceived common cause – an excess of a notional fluid known as "black bile", which was commonly linked to the spleen. Hippocrates and other ancient physicians described melancholia as a distinct disease with mental and physical symptoms, including persistent fears and despondencies, poor appetite, abulia, sleeplessness, irritability, and agitation. Later, fixed delusions were added by Galen and other physicians to the list of symptoms. In the Middle Ages, the understanding of melancholia shifted to a religious perspective, with sadness seen as a vice and demonic possession, rather than somatic causes, as a potential cause of the disease.

During the late 16th and early 17th centuries, a cultural and literary cult of melancholia emerged in England, linked to Neoplatonist and humanist Marsilio Ficino's transformation of melancholia from a sign of vice into a mark of genius. This fashionable melancholy became a prominent theme in literature, art, and music of the era.

Between the late 18th and late 19th centuries, melancholia was a common medical diagnosis. In this period, the focus was on the abnormal beliefs associated with the disorder, rather than depression and affective symptoms. In the 19th century, melancholia was considered to be rooted in subjective 'passions' that seemingly caused disordered mood (in contrast to modern biomedical explanations for mood disorders). In Victorian Britain, the notion of melancholia as a disease evolved as it became increasingly classifiable and diagnosable with a set list of symptoms that contributed to a biomedical model for understanding the mental disease. However, in the 20th century, the focus again shifted, and the term became used essentially as a synonym for depression. Indeed, modern concepts of depression as a mood disorder eventually arose from this historical context. Today, the term "melancholia" and "melancholic" are still used in medical diagnostic classification, such as in ICD-11 and DSM-5, to specify certain features that may be present in major depression. The 20th and 21st century accounts of depression are the successors of melancholia in psychiatry, but melancholia (or melancholy) also had a much wider use before the 19th century. It was a subject with which not only psychiatrists and doctors, but also philosophers, poets, artists, and writers all engaged. This led to a relatively ambiguous field of meaning, in which melancholy was accommodated within an understanding of human nature on the basis of humoral theory.

Related terms used in historical medicine include lugubriousness (from Latin lugere, 'to mourn'), moroseness (from Latin morosus, 'self-will or fastidious habit'), wistfulness (from a blend of wishful and the obsolete English wistly, meaning 'intently'), and saturnineness (from Latin Saturninus, 'of the planet Saturn').

== Early history ==
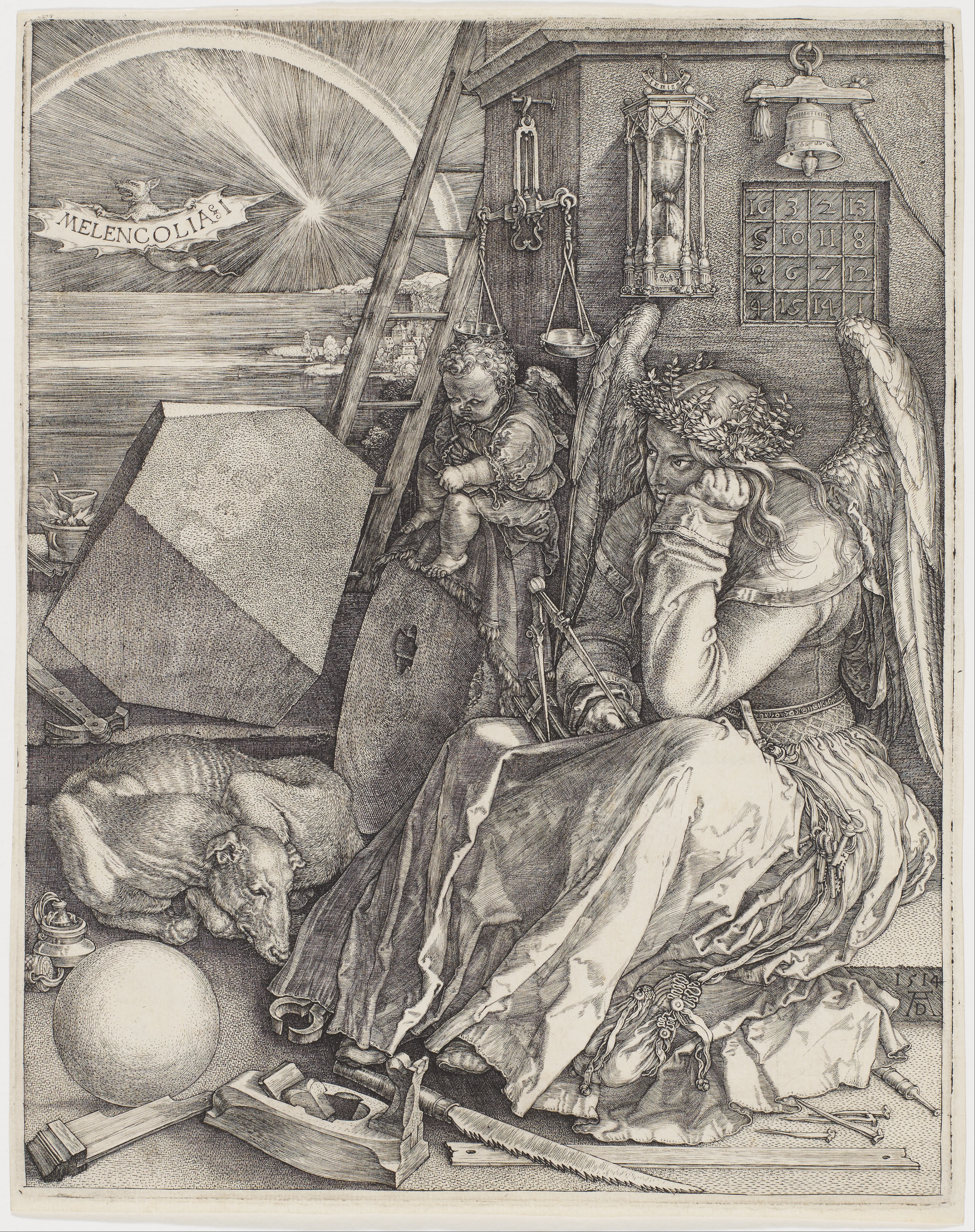
Melencolia I by Albrecht Dürer, 1514

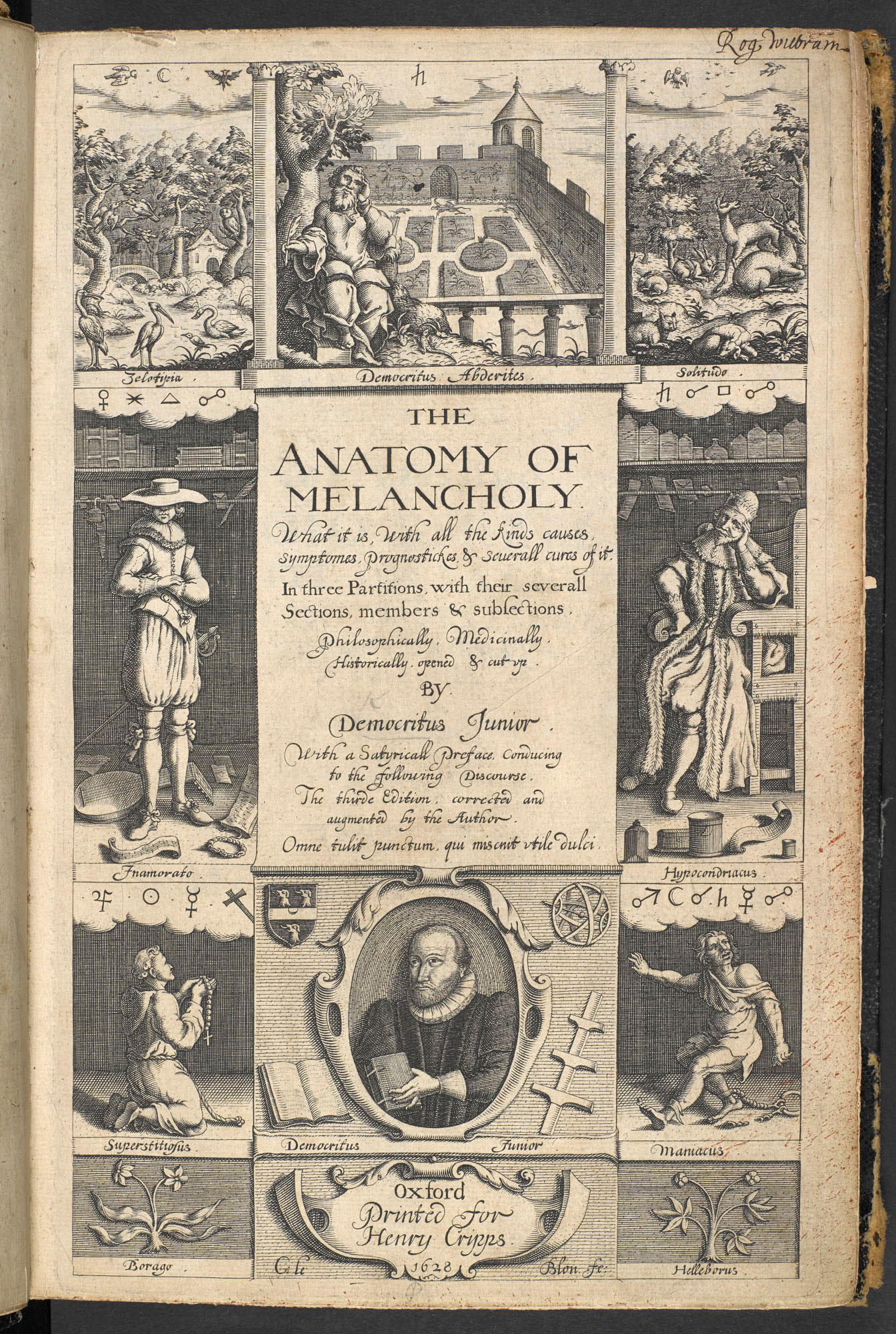
Frontispiece for the 1628 3rd edition of The Anatomy of Melancholy

The name "melancholia" comes from the old medical belief of the four humours: disease or ailment being caused by an imbalance in one or more of the four basic bodily liquids, or humours. Personality types were similarly determined by the dominant humor in a particular person. According to Hippocrates and subsequent tradition, melancholia was caused by an excess of black bile, hence the name, which means "black bile", from Ancient Greek μέλας (melas), "dark, black", and χολή (kholé), "bile"; a person whose constitution tended to have a preponderance of black bile had a melancholic disposition. In the complex elaboration of humorist theory, it was associated with the earth from the Four Elements, the season of autumn, the spleen as the originating organ and cold and dry as related qualities. In astrology it showed the influence of Saturn, hence the related adjective saturnine.

Melancholia was described as a distinct disease with particular mental and physical symptoms in the 5th and 4th centuries BC. Hippocrates, in his Aphorisms, characterized all "fears and despondencies, if they last a long time" as being symptomatic of melancholia. Other symptoms mentioned by Hippocrates include: poor appetite, abulia, sleeplessness, irritability, agitation. The Hippocratic clinical description of melancholia shows significant overlaps with contemporary nosography of depressive syndromes (6 symptoms out of the 9 included in DSM diagnostic criteria for a Major Depressive).

In ancient Rome, Galen added "fixed delusions" to the set of symptoms listed by Hippocrates. Galen also believed that melancholia caused cancer. Aretaeus of Cappadocia, in turn, believed that melancholia involved both a state of anguish, and a delusion. In the 10th century Persian physician Al-Akhawayni Bokhari described melancholia as a chronic illness caused by the impact of black bile on the brain. He described melancholia's initial clinical manifestations as "suffering from an unexplained fear, inability to answer questions or providing false answers, self-laughing and self-crying and speaking meaninglessly, yet with no fever."

In Middle-Ages Europe, the humoral, somatic paradigm for understanding sustained sadness lost primacy in front of the prevailing religious perspective. Sadness came to be a vice (λύπη in the Greek vice list by Evagrius Ponticus, tristitia vel acidia in the 7 vice list by Pope Gregory I). When a patient could not be cured of the disease it was thought that the melancholia was a result of demonic possession.

In his study of French and Burgundian courtly culture, Johan Huizinga noted that "at the close of the Middle Ages, a sombre melancholy weighs on people's souls." In chronicles, poems, sermons, even in legal documents, an immense sadness, a note of despair and a fashionable sense of suffering and deliquescence at the approaching end of times, suffuses court poets and chroniclers alike: Huizinga quotes instances in the ballads of Eustache Deschamps, "monotonous and gloomy variations of the same dismal theme", and in Georges Chastellain's prologue to his Burgundian chronicle, and in the late 15th-century poetry of Jean Meschinot. Ideas of reflection and the workings of imagination are blended in the term merencolie, embodying for contemporaries "a tendency", observes Huizinga, "to identify all serious occupation of the mind with sadness".

Painters were considered by Vasari and other writers to be especially prone to melancholy by the nature of their work, sometimes with good effects for their art in increased sensitivity and use of fantasy. Among those of his contemporaries so characterised by Vasari were Pontormo and Parmigianino, but he does not use the term of Michelangelo, who used it, perhaps not very seriously, of himself. A famous allegorical engraving by Albrecht Dürer is entitled Melencolia I. This engraving has been interpreted as portraying melancholia as the state of waiting for inspiration to strike, and not necessarily as a depressive affliction. Amongst other allegorical symbols, the picture includes a magic square and a truncated rhombohedron. The image in turn inspired a passage in The City of Dreadful Night by James Thomson (B.V.), and, a few years later, a sonnet by Edward Dowden.

The most extended treatment of melancholia comes from Robert Burton, whose The Anatomy of Melancholy (1621) treats the subject from both a literary and a medical perspective. His concept of melancholia includes all mental illness, which he divides into different types. Burton wrote in the 17th century that music and dance were critical in treating mental illness.

But to leave all declamatory speeches in praise of divine music, I will confine myself to my proper subject: besides that excellent power it hath to expel many other diseases, it is a sovereign remedy against despair and melancholy, and will drive away the devil himself. Canus, a Rhodian fiddler, in Philostratus, when Apollonius was inquisitive to know what he could do with his pipe, told him, "That he would make a melancholy man merry, and him that was merry much merrier than before, a lover more enamoured, a religious man more devout." Ismenias the Theban, Chiron the centaur, is said to have cured this and many other diseases by music alone: as now they do those, saith Bodine, that are troubled with St. Vitus's Bedlam dance.

In the Encyclopédie of Diderot and d'Alembert, the causes of melancholia are stated to be similar to those that cause Mania: "grief, pains of the spirit, passions, as well as all the love and sexual appetites that go unsatisfied."

== English cultural movement ==
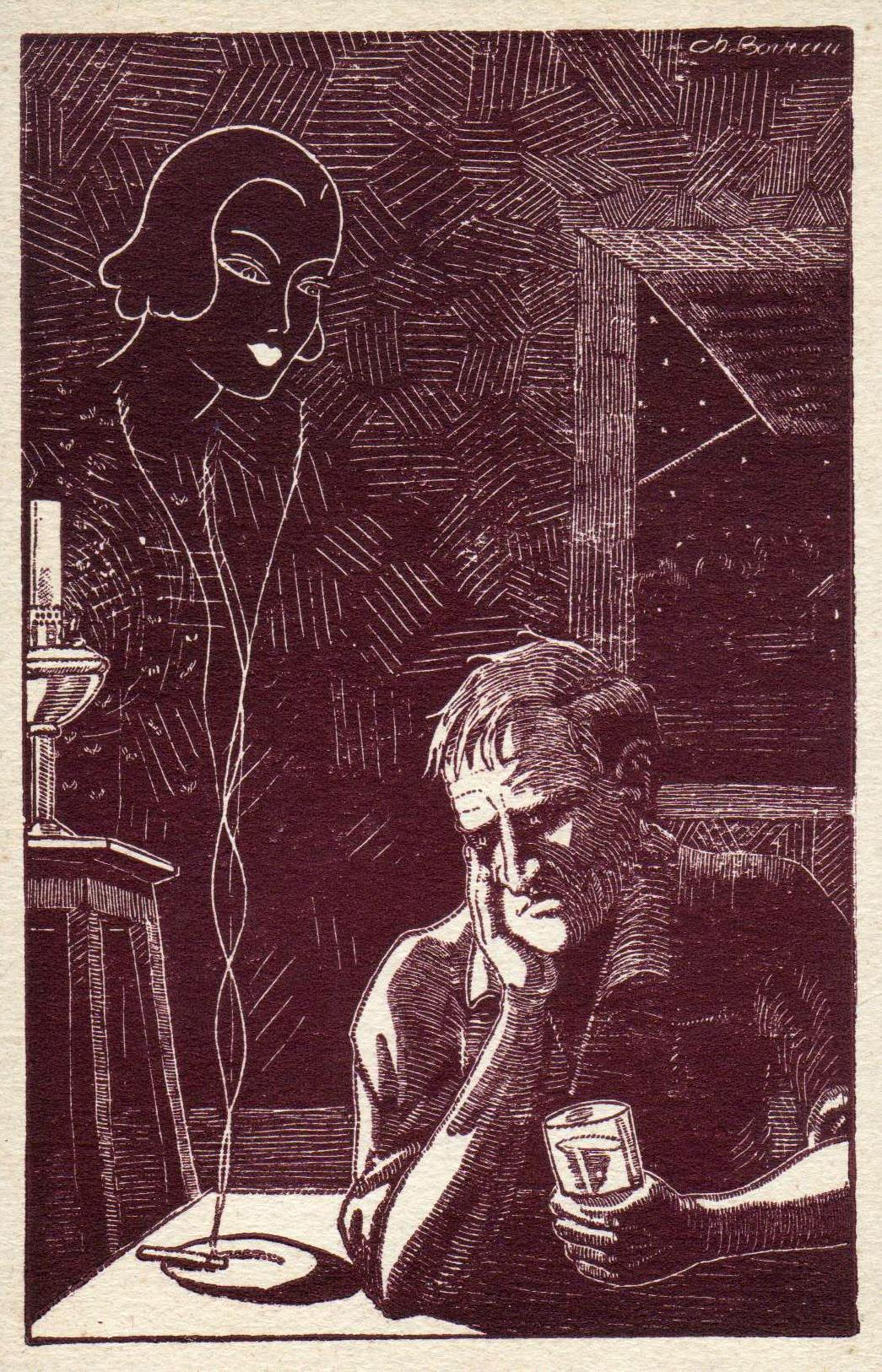
Ch. Boirau, The Spleen (Melancholy). Postcard, c. 1915.

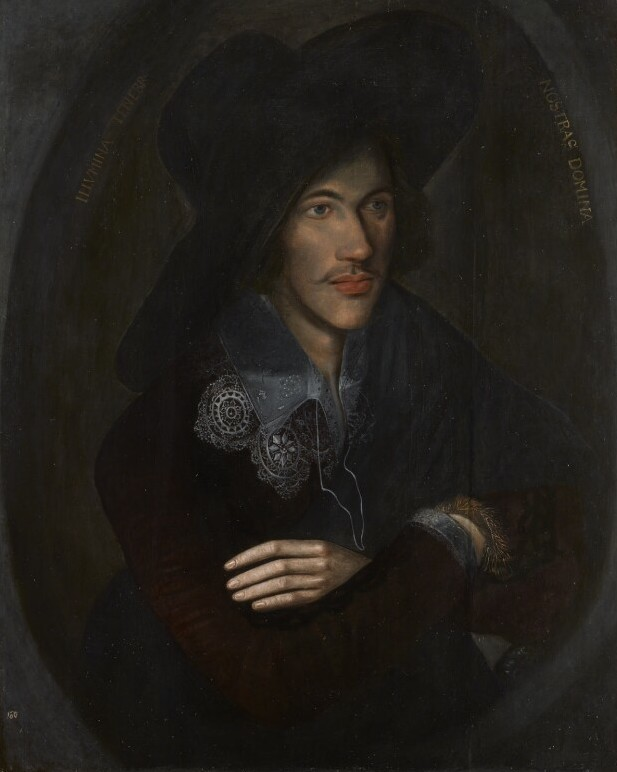
The young John Donne, the very picture of fashionable melancholy in the Jacobean era

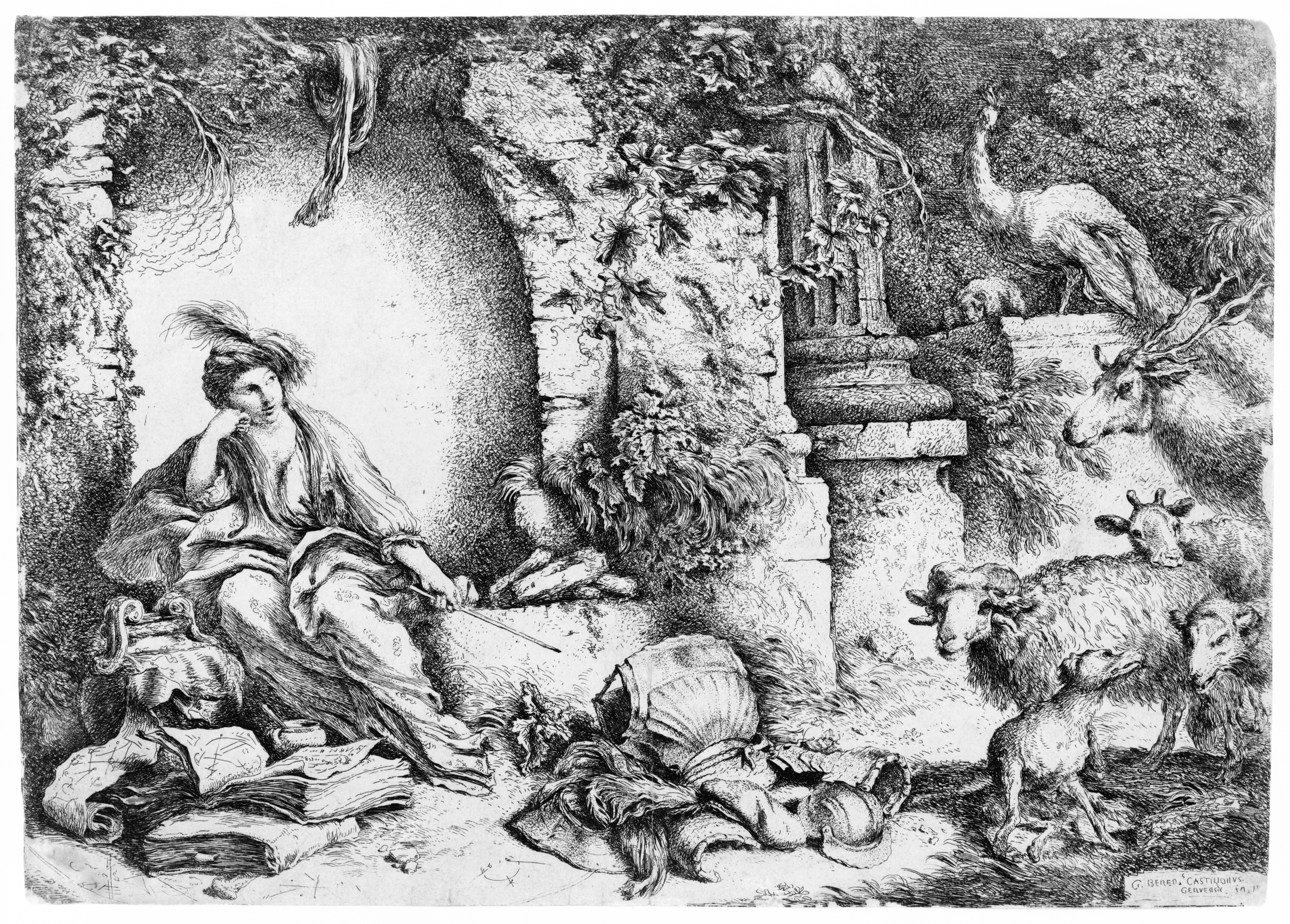
Melancholy, etching by Giovanni Benedetto Castiglione, 1640s

During the later 16th and early 17th centuries, a curious cultural and literary cult of melancholia arose in England. In an influential 1964 essay in Apollo, art historian Roy Strong traced the origins of this fashionable melancholy to the thought of the popular Neoplatonist and humanist Marsilio Ficino (1433–1499), who replaced the medieval notion of melancholia with something new:

Ficino transformed what had hitherto been regarded as the most calamitous of all the humours into the mark of genius. Small wonder that eventually the attitudes of melancholy soon became an indispensable adjunct to all those with artistic or intellectual pretentions.

The Anatomy of Melancholy (The Anatomy of Melancholy, What it is: With all the Kinds, Causes, Symptomes, Prognostickes, and Several Cures of it... Philosophically, Medicinally, Historically, Opened and Cut Up) by Burton, was first published in 1621 and remains a defining literary monument to the fashion. Another major English author who made extensive expression upon being of an melancholic disposition is Sir Thomas Browne in his Religio Medici (1643).

Night-Thoughts (The Complaint: or, Night-Thoughts on Life, Death, & Immortality), a long poem in blank verse by Edward Young was published in nine parts (or "nights") between 1742 and 1745, and hugely popular in several languages. It had a considerable influence on early Romantics in England, France and Germany. William Blake was commissioned to illustrate a later edition.

In the visual arts, this fashionable intellectual melancholy occurs frequently in portraiture of the era, with sitters posed in the form of "the lover, with his crossed arms and floppy hat over his eyes, and the scholar, sitting with his head resting on his hand" – descriptions drawn from the frontispiece to the 1638 edition of Burton's Anatomy, which shows just such by-then stock characters. These portraits were often set out of doors where Nature provides "the most suitable background for spiritual contemplation" or in a gloomy interior.

In music, the post-Elizabethan cult of melancholia is associated with John Dowland, whose motto was Semper Dowland, semper dolens ("Always Dowland, always mourning"). The melancholy man, known to contemporaries as a "malcontent", is epitomized by Shakespeare's Prince Hamlet, the "Melancholy Dane".

A similar phenomenon, though not under the same name, occurred during the German Sturm und Drang movement, with such works as The Sorrows of Young Werther by Goethe or in Romanticism with works such as Ode on Melancholy by John Keats or in Symbolism with works such as Isle of the Dead by Arnold Böcklin. In the 20th century, much of the counterculture of modernism was fueled by comparable alienation and a sense of purposelessness called "anomie"; earlier artistic preoccupation with death has gone under the rubric of memento mori. The medieval condition of acedia (acedie in English) and the Romantic Weltschmerz were similar concepts, most likely to affect the intellectual.

== Modern connotations ==
Until the 18th century, writings on melancholia were mainly concerned with beliefs that were considered abnormal, rather than affective symptoms.

Melancholia was a category that "the well-to-do, the sedentary, and the studious were even more liable to be placed in the eighteenth century than they had been in preceding centuries."

In the 20th century, "melancholia" lost its attachment to abnormal beliefs, and in common usage became entirely a synonym for depression. Sigmund Freud published a paper on Mourning and Melancholia in 1918.

In 1907, the German psychiatrist Emil Kraepelin influentially proposed the existence of a condition he called 'involutional melancholia', which he thought could help explain the more frequent occurrence of depression among elderly people. He surmised that in the elderly "the processes of involution in the body are suited to engender mournful or anxious moodiness", though by 1913 he had returned to his earlier view (first expounded in 1899) that age-related depression could be understood in terms of manic-depressive illness.

In 1996, Gordon Parker and Dusan Hadzi-Pavlovic described "melancholia" as a specific disorder of movement and mood. They attached the term to the concept of "endogenous depression" (claimed to be caused by internal forces rather than environmental influences).

In 2006, Michael Alan Taylor and Max Fink also defined melancholia as a systemic disorder that could be identified by depressive mood rating scales, verified by the presence of abnormal cortisol metabolism. They considered it to be characterized by depressed mood, abnormal motor functions, and abnormal vegetative signs, and they described several forms, including retarded depression, psychotic depression and postpartum depression.

=== Melancholic depression ===
Melancholic depression
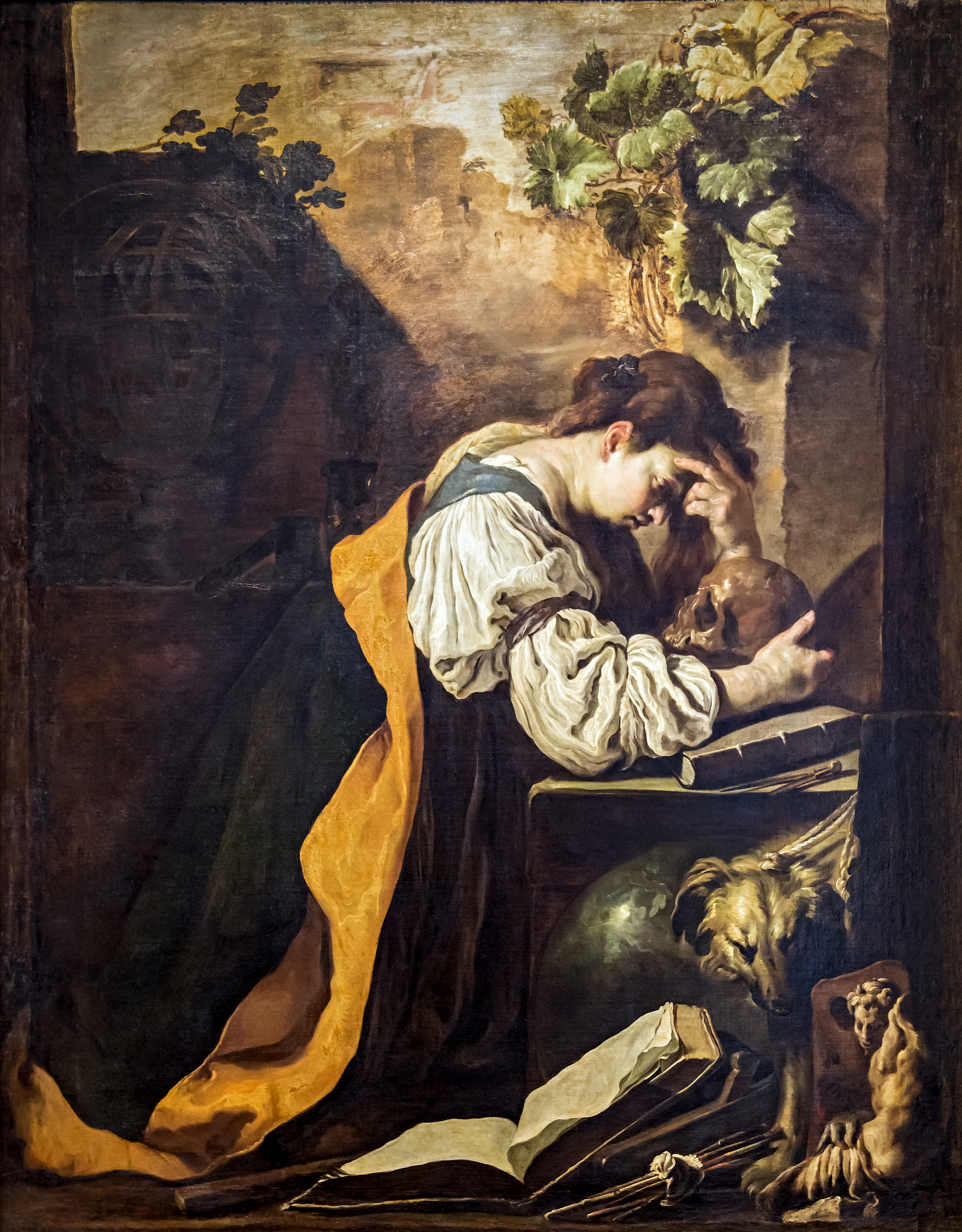
- Meditation by Domenico Fetti 1618
- Specialty: Psychiatry
- Symptoms: Low mood, low self-esteem, fatigue, insomnia, anorexia, anhedonia, lack of mood reactivity
- Complications: Self harm, suicide
- Usual onset: Early adulthood
- Causes: Genetic, environmental, and psychological factors
- Risk factors: Family history, trauma
- Treatment: Counseling, antidepressant medication, electroconvulsive therapy

For the purposes of medical diagnostic classification, the terms melancholia and melancholic are still in use (for example, in ICD-11 and DSM-5) to specify certain features that may be present in major depression, referred to as depression with melancholic features such as:

- severely depressed mood, wherein the person often feels despondent, forlorn, disconsolate, or empty
- pervasive anhedonia – loss of interest or pleasure in most activities that are normally enjoyable
- lack of emotional responsiveness (mood does not brighten, even briefly) to normally pleasurable stimuli (such as food or entertainment) or situations (such as warm, affectionate interactions with friends or family)
- terminal insomnia – unwanted early morning awakening (two or more hours earlier than normal)
- marked psychomotor retardation or agitation
- marked loss of appetite or weight loss

A specifier essentially is a subcategory of a disease, explaining specific features or symptoms that are added to the main diagnosis. According to the DSM-IV, the "melancholic features" specifier may be applied to the following only:

1. Major depressive episode, single episode
2. Major depressive episode, recurrent episode
3. Bipolar I disorder, most recent episode depressed
4. Bipolar II disorder, most recent episode depressed

People who have melancholic depression do not need to have melancholic features in every depressive episode.

==== Signs and symptoms ====
Melancholic depression requires at least one of the following symptoms during the last depressive episode:

- Anhedonia (the inability to find pleasure in positive things)
- Lack of mood reactivity (i.e. mood does not improve in response to positive/desired events; failure to feel better)

And at least three of the following:

- Depressed mood that is subjectively different from grief or loss (marked by despair, gloominess, and "empty-mood")
- Severe weight loss or loss of appetite
- Psychomotor agitation or retardation (i.e. increased or decreased movement, speech, and cognitive function)
- Early morning awakening (i.e. waking up at least 2 hours before the normal wake up time of the patient)
- Guilt that is excessive
- Worse depressed mood in the morning

Melancholic features apply to an episode of depression that occurs as part of either major depressive disorder, persistent depressive disorder (dysthymia), or bipolar disorder I or II. They are more likely to occur in patients who have depression with psychotic features. People with melancholic depression also tend to have more physically visible symptoms such as slower movement or speech.

==== Causes ====
The causes of melancholic depressive disorder are believed to be mostly biological factors that can be hereditary. Biological origins of the condition include problems with the HPA axis and sleep structure of patients. MRI studies have indicated that melancholic depressed patients have issues with the connections between different regions of the brain, specifically the insula and fronto-parietal cortex. Some studies have found that there are biological marker differences between patients with melancholic depression and other subtypes of depression.

The research regarding melancholic depression consistently finds that men are more likely to receive a melancholic depression diagnosis.

==== Treatment ====
Melancholic depression, due to some fundamental differences with standard clinical depression or other subtypes of depression, has specific types of treatments that work, and the success rates for different treatments can vary. Treatment can involve antidepressants and empirically supported treatments such as cognitive behavioral therapy and interpersonal therapy for depression.

Melancholic depression is often considered to be a biologically based and particularly severe form of depression. Therefore, the treatments for this specifier of depression are more biomedical and less psychosocial (which would include talk therapy and social support). The general initial or "ideal" treatment for melancholic depression is antidepressant medication, and psychotherapy is added later on as support if at all. The scientific support for medication as the best treatment is that patients with melancholic depression are less likely to improve with placebos, unlike other depression patients. This indicates the improvements observed after medication actually come from the biological basis of the condition and the treatment. There are several types of antidepressants that can be prescribed including SSRIs, SNRIs, tricyclic antidepressants, and MAOIs; the antidepressants tend to vary on how they work and what specific chemical messengers in the brain they target. SNRIs are generally more effective than SSRIs because they target more than one chemical messenger (serotonin and norepinephrine).

Although psychotherapy treatments can be used such as talk therapy and cognitive behavioral therapy (CBT), they have shown to be less effective than medication. In a randomized clinical trial, it was shown that CBT was less effective than medication in treating symptoms of melancholic depression after 12 weeks.

Electroconvulsive therapy (ECT) was previously believed to be an effective treatment for melancholic depression. ECT has been more commonly used for patients with melancholic depression due to the severity. In 2010, a study found that 60% of depression patients treated with ECT had melancholic symptoms. However, studies since the 2000s have failed to demonstrate positive treatment results from ECT, although studies also indicate a more positive response to ECT in melancholic patients than other depressed patients.

It has been observed in studies that patients with melancholic depression tend to recover less often than other types of depression.

==== Frequency ====
The prevalence of having the melancholic depression specifier among patients diagnosed with clinical depression is estimated to be about 25% to 30%.

The incidence of melancholic depression has been found to increase when the temperature and/or sunlight are low.

== See also ==
- Boredom
- Dysthymia
- Got the morbs
- Melancholic depression
- Mono no aware
- Nostalgia
- Pessimism
- Saudade
- Spleen
- Vapours (disease)
- Wit and Mirth, or Pills to Purge Melancholy
