= Retarded depression =

Outdated term for a category of depression

Retarded depression is a category of depression characterized by slow thinking and behavior (psychomotor retardation). It is contrasted with agitated depression (characterized by heightened psycho motor activity). Though some clinicians continue to use the term, as a diagnostic category of depression it has largely been displaced by those in the American Psychiatric Association's Diagnostic and Statistical Manual of Mental Disorders or the World Health Organization ICD due to the use of the term "retarded", now considered outdated terminology.
