= 3-Methoxy-4-hydroxyphenylglycol =

Names
- Preferred IUPAC name 1-(4-Hydroxy-3-methoxyphenyl)ethane-1,2-diol
- Other names MHPG

Identifiers
CAS Number	534-82-7
3D model (JSmol)	Interactive image; Interactive image
ChemSpider	10348
KEGG	C05594
MeSH	Methoxyhydroxyphenylglycol
PubChem CID	10805
UNII	98LK01183Z
CompTox Dashboard (EPA)	DTXSID20862142
- InChI: InChI=1S/C9H12O4/c1-13-9-4-6(8(12)5-10)2-3-7(9)11/h2-4,8,10-12H,5H2,1H3 Key: FBWPWWWZWKPJFL-UHFFFAOYSA-N; InChI=1/C9H12O4/c1-13-9-4-6(8(12)5-10)2-3-7(9)11/h2-4,8,10-12H,5H2,1H3 Key: FBWPWWWZWKPJFL-UHFFFAOYAR
- SMILES: COC1=C(C=CC(=C1)C(CO)O)O; Oc1ccc(cc1OC)C(O)CO

Properties
Chemical formula	C_{9}H_{12}O_{4}
Molar mass	184.18918
- Except where otherwise noted, data are given for materials in their standard state (at 25 °C [77 °F], 100 kPa). verify (what is ?) Infobox references

3-Methoxy-4-hydroxyphenylglycol (MHPG, MOPEG) is a metabolite of norepinephrine degradation. In the brain, it is the principal norepinephrine metabolite. It is released into the blood and cerebrospinal fluid, and a blood sample of it may therefore be an indication of recent sympathetic nervous system activity.

Low levels of MHPG in the blood and cerebrospinal fluid are associated with anorexia nervosa and pathological gambling, indicating that norepinephrine may play a role in these behaviors.

Norepinephrine degradation. 3-Methoxy-4-hydroxyphenylglycol is shown at right. Enzymes are shown in boxes.
