= Endogenous depression =

Type of clinical depression

Endogenous depression is an atypical subclass of major depressive disorder (clinical depression). It could be caused by genetic and biological factors. Endogenous depression occurs due to the presence of an internal (cognitive, biological) stressor instead of an external (social, environmental) stressor. Endogenous depression includes patients with treatment-resistant, non-psychotic, major depressive disorder, characterized by abnormal behavior of the endogenous opioid system but not the monoaminergic system. Symptoms vary in severity, type, and frequency and can be attributed to cognitive, social, biological, or environmental factors that result in persistent feelings of sadness and distress. Since symptoms are due to a biological phenomenon, prevalence rates tend to be higher in older adults. Due to this fact, biological-focused treatment plans are often used in therapy to ensure the best prognosis.

Endogenous depression was part of the Kraepelinian dichotomy system.

== Signs and symptoms ==
The forefront indication that a depressive episode is manifesting is the sudden loss of energy or motivation in daily routines. When this occurs, it is not uncommon for individuals to seek medical attention with excessive worrying or anxiety that a more severe, physiological disease may be the underlying issue. However, without an actual disease present, this neurotic thinking often results in severe anxiety, sleep disturbance, and mood swings which may hinder social relationships. Individuals with endogenous depression may experience inconsistencies in symptom severity which is often the reason for delayed treatment. If left untreated, symptoms may progress to a major depressive episode.

== Risk factors ==
Endogenous depression occurs as the results of an internal stressor—commonly cognitive or biological—and not an external factor. Potential risk factors include these cognitive or biological factors. Patients with endogenous depression often are more likely to have a positive family history of disorders and fewer psychosocial and environmental factors that cause their symptoms. A family history of depression and perceived poor intimate relationships are internal risk factors associated with this type of depression. It is important to know these risk factors in order to take steps to recognize and help prevent this illness.

== Treatment ==
Clinicians generally favor treatments such as antidepressant and mood-stabilizing medication and electroconvulsive therapy (ECT). ECT is an effective treatment option for endogenous depression. Both medication and ECT can be used in the short-term to treat acute episodes of endogenous depression, and in the long-term to reduce the risk of recurrence. During the first two decades of the 21st century, a new promising alternative/adjunctive depression treatment method known as transcranial magnetic stimulation, or TMS as it's more commonly known, has become available.

== Prevalence ==
This type of depression often occurs due to biological reasons. Since symptoms are due to an internal phenomena, prevalence rates tend to be higher in older adults and more prevalent among women. Although endogenous depression has been associated with increased age, there have been few attempts to evaluate this fully. More research is needed to indicate factual prevalence rates on this type of depression in society.

== History ==
Endogenous depression was initially considered valuable as a means of diagnostic differentiation with reactive depression. While the latter's onset could be attributed to adverse life events and treated with talk therapy, the former would indicate treatment with antidepressants. Indeed, this view of endogenous depression is at the root of the popular view that mood disorders are a reflection of a 'chemical imbalance' in the brain. More recent research has shown that the probability of an endogenous depression patient experiencing an adverse life event prior to a depressive episode is roughly the same as for a reactive depression patient and the efficacy of antidepressant therapy bears no statistical correlation with the patient's diagnostic classification along this axis.

== See also ==
- Biopsychiatry controversy
- Biological psychiatry
