= C17H21NO =

The molecular formula C_{17}H_{21}NO (molar mass: 255.35 g/mol, exact mass: 255.1623 u) may refer to:

- Atomoxetine
- Diphenhydramine
- Oxifentorex
- Phenyltoloxamine
- Tofenacin
