= Alclofenac =

Chemical compound

Clinical data
- AHFS/Drugs.com: International Drug Names
- Routes of administration: Oral, rectal
- Drug class: Non-steroidal anti-inflammatory drug (NSAID)
- ATC code: M01AB06 (WHO)

Pharmacokinetic data
- Protein binding: 90-99%
- Elimination half-life: 1.5-5.5 h
- Excretion: Mostly renal

Identifiers
- IUPAC name: 2-(3-chloro-4-prop-2-enoxyphenyl)acetic acid
- CAS Number: 22131-79-9
- PubChem CID: 30951
- ChemSpider: 28714
- UNII: M9CP5H21N8
- KEGG: D01252
- ChEMBL: ChEMBL94081
- CompTox Dashboard (EPA): DTXSID4020038
- ECHA InfoCard: 100.040.709

Chemical and physical data
- Formula: C_{11}H_{11}ClO_{3}
- Molar mass: 226.66 g·mol^{−1}
- 3D model (JSmol): Interactive image
- Melting point: 90–91 °C (194–196 °F)
- Solubility in water: 0.0131 mg/mL (20 °C)
- SMILES: Clc1cc(ccc1OC\C=C)CC(=O)O
- InChI: InChI=1S/C11H11ClO3/c1-2-5-15-10-4-3-8(6-9(10)12)7-11(13)14/h2-4,6H,1,5,7H2,(H,13,14); Key:ARHWPKZXBHOEEE-UHFFFAOYSA-N

Alclofenac is a non-steroidal anti-inflammatory drug (NSAID) of the arylacetic acid class, that was mainly used for rheumatic disorders, such as rheumatoid arthritis, degenerative joint disease, and ankylosing spondylitis. It exhibits anti‑inflammatory, analgesic, and antipyretic properties primarily through reversible inhibition of cyclooxygenase (COX) enzymes and subsequent suppression of prostaglandin synthesis. However, it has largely fallen into disuse in favour of safer alternatives such as aceclofenac and was even withdrawn from multiple countries’ markets due to concerns about some of its side effects.

It can be taken orally or rectally. Administration by injection is difficult, since alclofenac is poorly soluble in physiological liquids. However, its lysine salt is water-soluble and can be given by injection.

Alclofenac is the generic name for the drug. It is also known under the trade names Allopydin, Medifenac, Mervan, Neosten, Neoston, Prinalgin, Reufenac, and Zumaral.

At room temperature it is an off-white to pale yellow solid. The regular dosage is 3 g daily for adults. When administered, the volume of distribution is 0.1 L/kg and the clarance for an oral dose of 500 mg in 37-69 ml/min.

== History ==
Alclofenac was, together with many similar arylacetic acids, studied in 1966 by Professor Buu-Hoi at the Radium Institute of the University of Paris as part of a study to find new non-steroid anti-inflammatory and analgesic drugs. Later, it was developed by Buu-Hoi and chemists at the Continental Pharma in Belgium.

Since alclofenac proved to cause little gastrointestinal damage, which is a common side effect of other NSAIDS such as aspirin, it was quickly suggested to be used as a drug for chronic rheumatoid arthritis and some other chronic inflammation disorders. It entered the UK market in July 1971.

Because the drug caused skin reactions and vasculitis in some patients, it was withdrawn from multiple countries’ markets, including the UK market in 1979. Nowadays, it is not used often anymore, since there are safer alternatives available, such as aceclofenac and diclofenac

== Medical uses ==
Alclofenac was primarily indicated for chronic inflammatory and degenerative rheumatic disorders.

Typical indications included:

- Rheumatoid arthritis, particularly in patients requiring long-term anti-inflammatory therapy
- Ankylosing spondylitis
- Degenerative joint disease (osteoarthritis) with inflammatory components
- Allied rheumatic disorders, such as non‑specific chronic polyarthritis and certain peri‑articular rheumatic conditions (e.g. tendinitis, bursitis)
- Low back pain and treatment of sciatica

In controlled clinical studies, alclofenac improved pain at rest and on movement, morning stiffness, grip strength, joint function scores, and reduced erythrocyte sedimentation rate (ESR). Long-term trials suggest sustained efficacy over months of therapy, with some evidence that biochemical markers of disease activity were suppressed.

The usual adult oral dosage reported in the 1970s literature was up to approximately 3 g/day in divided doses. Alclofenac lysinate allowed injectable administration, primarily in experimental and some clinical contexts where local administration was desired.

Compared to other NSAIDs of its time, especially indomethacin, alclofenac was seen as causing fewer upper gastrointestinal side effects. As a result, it was sometimes preferred for patients with a history of peptic ulcers or other gastrointestinal conditions that made stronger irritant drugs less suitable.

== Contraindications ==
Contraindications to alclofenac were generally in line with those for other non-selective NSAIDs.

Contraindications include:

- Known hypersensitivity to alclofenac, other arylacetic acid derivatives, or any other NSAIDs associated with bronchospasm, urticaria, agio-oedema, or severe cutaneous reactions
- Active peptic ulcers, recent gastrointestinal bleeding, or severe inflammatory bowel disease
- Severe hepatic impairment or renal insufficiency

== Side effects ==
=== Skin reactions and vasculitis ===
The most notable side effects of Alclofenac are skin reactions and vasculitis The majority is cases showing an allergic reaction towards the skin, and almost 10% of these allergic reactions are severe and/or accompanied by systemic symptoms.

Furthermore, common side effects of Alclofenac are dyspepsia, nausea, vomiting, abdominal pain, diarrhoea, and flatulence, which are in keeping with the gastrointestinal toxicity that are typical for non‑selective NSAIDs. Besides endoscopic and clinical observations suggested that Alclofenac produced less severe gastric mucosal damage than high‑doses of aspirin and some contemporaneous NSAIDs like indomethacin, although serious complications such as ulceration and gastrointestinal bleeding were still reported. In long‑term trials in rheumatoid arthritis, the overall incidence of gastrointestinal side effects with alclofenac was broadly similar to comparator drugs outside specific high‑risk subgroups, and dose reduction or withdrawal for gastrointestinal intolerance was sometimes necessary. Other side effects include dizziness, headache, leukopenia, and increased frequency of urinating.

A report from 1974 discussed three cases of patients developing vasculitis after taking alclofenac in the UK. The exact mechanism of the vasculitis is not completely understood yet, but it is very likely immune-mediated. It is suspected to either be caused by deposition of immune-complexes, or T-cell mediated.

It is hypothesised that these hypersensitivity reactions of alclofenac are a byproduct of an epoxide biotransformation, which may activate the immune system in some people. It acts for example, as a hapten (small immunogenic molecule). This hypothesis is supported by the fact that hypersensitivity reactions to Alclofenac are relatively common in people who have reported intolerance to penicillin, gold salts, and/or salicylates. These side effects eventually lead to Alclofenac being withdrawn from most of the pharmaceutical markets, including the UK.

== Pharmacology ==
=== Pharmacokinetics ===
Alclofenac is well-absorbed within the gastrointestinal tract and there appears to be no difference between oral/rectal consumption in relation to absorption. Also, oral and rectal consumption seems to be equally effective. However, bioavailability is reported to be lower whenever it is consumed after a meal. Peak concentrations occur during the second hour of administration. The drug is highly bound to plasma proteins, and the volume of distribution is very low. The half-life is approximately 2.5 hours.

Furthermore, Alclofenac can enter the fluid within the joints, with the peak concentration occurring one hour after the peak plasma concentration. It has also been determined that the Alclofenac concentration in the synovial fluid is significantly greater than the concentration in the plasma, after six hours following administration. This implies that Alclofenac in the synovial fluid is bio-transformed at a much slower rate than Alclofenac in the blood plasma.

In humans, Alclofenac is mostly excreted renally as an unchanged substance and as glucuronide by-product. Other main biotransformation includes 4-(2,3-dihydroxy) propyloxy-3-chlorophenyl acetic acid and 4-hydroxy-3-chlorophenylacetic acid. The ratios in which these biotransformation products are produced from Alclofenac differ between species.

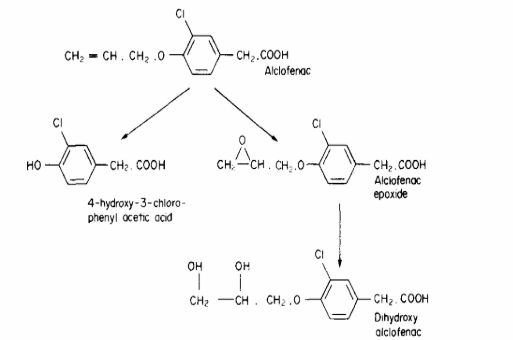
The main biotransformation pathways of alclofenac (glucuronidation not shown).

Biotransformation of Alclofenac yields a stable epoxide intermediate. This epoxide has been identified in human and mouse urine and is most likely a precursor to the 4-(2,3-dihydroxy)propyloxy-3-chlorophenyl acetic acid biotransformation product. The epoxide has shown mutagenic potential in the Ames test and has also been associated with in vitro destruction of CYP450. In addition, the epoxide may act as a hapten, explaining hypersensitivity reactions in sensitive individuals taking Alclofenac.

=== Mechanism of action ===
Alclofenac is non-steroidal anti-inflammatory drug (NSAID). It works as a reversible antagonist and inhibits the synthesis of prostaglandin H2. By inhibiting Cyclooxygenase enzymes (COX-1, COX-2), the conversion of arachidonic acid to cyclic endoperoxides is inhibited, which are precursors of prostaglandins and prostacyclins, that are known as inflammatory mediators. The inhibition of prostaglandins synthesis explains the analgesic (pain reduction), antipyretic (fever reduction) and platelet-inhibitory actions (inhibition of platelet aggregation).

In addition to the inhibition of prostaglandins synthesis, it has long been recognised that NSAID such as Alclofenac also displace endogenous anti-inflammatory substances from plasma protein binding sites. Plasma protein binding properties are primary drivers of the pharmacokinetic properties of the NSAIDs. This mechanism of action is thought to be equally important as the inhibition of prostaglandin synthesis. Through high binding affinity, Alclofenac displaces endogenous substances such as the amino acid L-tryptophan from their binding site on plasma proteins. Endogenous substrates such as L-tryptophan are believed to have anti-inflammatory properties. Effective anti-inflammatory drugs such as Alclofenac have been demonstrated to displace tryptophan in vivo and in vitro. By liberating these L-tryptophan from plasma protein, the free form can exert anti-inflammatory effects on the tissues.

Furthermore, Alclofenac influences the erythrocyte sedimentation rate (ESR). Elevated levels of acute phase proteins are regularly observed during rheumatoid arthritis and they contribute to ESR, which is a clinical characteristic of inflammation. By reducing levels of acute-phase proteins such as fibrinogen, gamma globulins, and C-reactive protein, Alclofenac can reduce ESR and overall inflammation markers. The suppression of these proteins may modify the disease and not just limit the alleviating symptoms, since the acute-phase response directly correlates with disease activity.

=== Toxicity ===
Alclofenac is considered hazardous, possessing acute oral toxicity.

Lethal dose administered orally (mg/kg):

- Mouse 1100
- Rat 1050

Lethal dose administered under the skin (mg/kg):

- Mouse 600
- Rat 630

Lethal dose administered interperitoneally (mg/kg):

- Mouse 550
- Rat 530

50,614 NSAID exposures were reported in the United States in 2 years, of which 131 (0.26%) had a major outcome, and 10 ended in death. In general, their effects are mild, but serious toxicity has also been reported in the form of seizures, hypotension, apnoea, coma and renal failure. These cases, however, stem from oral administration in large amounts in adults or accidental exposure in small quantities in children. An overdose would typically cause nausea, vomiting, headache, drowsiness, blurred vision, and dizziness. Symptoms are unlikely after ingestion of under 100 mg/kg and would be survivable under 400 mg/kg.

Alclofenac and DHA (dihydroxyalclofenac, a metabolite of alclofenac) were shown to not be mutagenic in vitro, nor in humans. AE (alclofenac epoxide, an intermediary metabolite), is mutagenic (with a dose related effect), but in the presence of a liver post-mitochondrial fraction its activity was substantially lowered. Male rats did not suffer dominant lethal mutations from Alclofenac in studies.

In another study in mice, using female mice with weights between 25 and 35 g, AE was proven to be more toxic than Alclofenac and DHA, but not acutely toxic, with symptoms still not showing up, either when given a single 500 mg/kg dose of AE or 7 daily doses of 50 mg/kg AE. It did not show any pain-relieving or anti-inflammatory effects, but it did show activity as an inhibitor of yeast alcohol dehydrogenase and alkylating agent in vitro, which might indicate immunosuppressive activity in vivo, as indicated also in long-term patient trials. The transformation frequency for Alclofenac and DHA did not exceed 6 μg/mL, whereas the reactive epoxide metabolites reached 125 μg/mL. Female guinea pigs weighing between 250 and 500 g, were also used to find that this metabolite is also a sensitising agent, explaining the skin rashes showing up in humans. This metabolite also can cause damage to cytochrome P-450. Other metabolites of alclofenac may also contribute to this process. However, its mechanisms remain unclear.

== Chemistry ==
=== Synthesis ===
There are multiple ways to synthesize Alclofenac. It can be synthesised from ortho-chlorophenol by performing Friedel-Crafts acylation on the aromatic ring to introduce and acetyl group and then adding the right functional groups by performing substitution reactions with 3-bromopropene and morpholine. Finally, reaction with the hydronium ion yields high purity alclofenac.

Pathway for the synthesis of alclofenac from ortho-chlorophenol

Alclofenac can also be synthesized from 3-chloro-4-alloxyphenylacetonitrile by hydrolysis of the nitrile group to a carboxylic acid group. This can be done by refluxing 103.7 g of 3-chloro-4-alloxyphenylacetonitrile in 500 mL of ethanol with 100 g of KOH and 100 mL of water for 4 hours. Then, the majority of the ethanol is evaporated, and the residue is diluted with water and ice and acidified with 20% HCl. After filtering the solid and washing it with petroleum ether, alclofenac powder can be obtained, which can be recrystallized from aqueous methanol. The yield for this method is reported to be 81%.

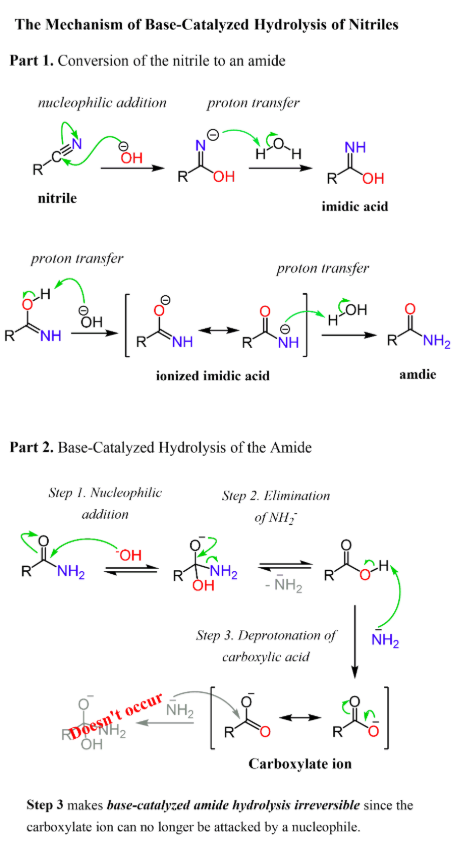
The general mechanism for base-catalysed hydrolysis of nitriles to carboxylate ions.

=== Structure and reactivity ===
Alclofenac is a monocarboxylic acid, an aromatic ether in which the ether oxygen links an allyl group to the 4-position of the aromatic ring of (3-chlorophenyl)acetic acid, and it can be considered a monochlorobenzene, as there is a chloride bonded to the 3-position of the aromatic ring. It resembles L-tryptophan, acts as a Bronsted acid and can participate in typical reactions of the functional groups it contains, such as esterification, or amide synthesis, and it stands out through its reactive allyloxy group. There are no alternative forms of alclofenac available.

Alclofenac is a terminal alkene, so it is relatively reactive. The terminal double bond undergoes biotransformation by CYP450 enzymes in both and humans, which results in formation of a reactive epoxide metabolite. This metabolite has been associated with skin reactions and hepatotoxicity and has also been shown to be mutagenic using the Ames test.
