= Zubrin =

Zubrin may refer to:

- Zubrin, a brand name for the drug tepoxalin
- Robert Zubrin (born 1952), American aerospace engineer and author
