= ATC code M01 =

ATC code M01 Anti-inflammatory and antirheumatic products is a therapeutic subgroup of the Anatomical Therapeutic Chemical Classification System, a system of alphanumeric codes developed by the World Health Organization (WHO) for the classification of drugs and other medical products. Subgroup M01 is part of the anatomical group M Musculo-skeletal system.

Codes for veterinary use (ATCvet codes) can be created by placing the letter Q in front of the human ATC code: for example, QM01. ATCvet codes without corresponding human ATC codes are cited with the leading Q in the following list.
National versions of the ATC classification may include additional codes not present in this list, which follows the WHO version.

== M01A Anti-inflammatory and antirheumatic products, non-steroids ==
=== M01AA Butylpyrazolidines ===
M01AA01 Phenylbutazone
M01AA02 Mofebutazone
M01AA03 Oxyphenbutazone
M01AA05 Clofezone
M01AA06 Kebuzone
QM01AA90 Suxibuzone
QM01AA99 Combinations

=== M01AB Acetic acid derivatives and related substances ===
M01AB01 Indometacin
M01AB02 Sulindac
M01AB03 Tolmetin
M01AB04 Zomepirac
M01AB05 Diclofenac
M01AB06 Alclofenac
M01AB07 Bumadizone
M01AB08 Etodolac
M01AB09 Lonazolac
M01AB10 Fentiazac
M01AB11 Acemetacin
M01AB12 Difenpiramide
M01AB13 Oxametacin
M01AB14 Proglumetacin
M01AB15 Ketorolac
M01AB16 Aceclofenac
M01AB17 Bufexamac
M01AB51 Indometacin, combinations
M01AB55 Diclofenac, combinations

=== M01AC Oxicams ===
M01AC01 Piroxicam
M01AC02 Tenoxicam
M01AC04 Droxicam
M01AC05 Lornoxicam
M01AC06 Meloxicam
M01AC56 Meloxicam, combinations

=== M01AE Propionic acid derivatives ===
M01AE01 Ibuprofen
M01AE02 Naproxen
M01AE03 Ketoprofen
M01AE04 Fenoprofen
M01AE05 Fenbufen
M01AE06 Benoxaprofen
M01AE07 Suprofen
M01AE08 Pirprofen
M01AE09 Flurbiprofen
M01AE10 Indoprofen
M01AE11 Tiaprofenic acid
M01AE12 Oxaprozin
M01AE13 Ibuproxam
M01AE14 Dexibuprofen
M01AE15 Flunoxaprofen
M01AE16 Alminoprofen
M01AE17 Dexketoprofen
M01AE18 Naproxcinod
M01AE19 Loxoprofen
M01AE20 Pelubiprofen
M01AE51 Ibuprofen, combinations
M01AE52 Naproxen and esomeprazole
M01AE53 Ketoprofen, combinations
M01AE56 Naproxen and misoprostol
M01AE57 Naproxen and diphenhydramine
QM01AE90 Vedaprofen
QM01AE91 Carprofen
QM01AE92 Tepoxalin

=== M01AG Fenamates ===
M01AG01 Mefenamic acid
M01AG02 Tolfenamic acid
M01AG03 Flufenamic acid
M01AG04 Meclofenamic acid
QM01AG90 Flunixin

=== M01AH Coxibs ===
M01AH01 Celecoxib
M01AH02 Rofecoxib
M01AH03 Valdecoxib
M01AH04 Parecoxib
M01AH05 Etoricoxib
M01AH06 Lumiracoxib
M01AH07 Polmacoxib
QM01AH90 Firocoxib
QM01AH91 Robenacoxib
QM01AH92 Mavacoxib
QM01AH93 Cimicoxib
QM01AH94 Deracoxib
QM01AH95 Enflicoxib

=== M01AX Other anti-inflammatory and antirheumatic agents, non-steroids ===
M01AX01 Nabumetone
M01AX02 Niflumic acid
M01AX04 Azapropazone
M01AX05 Glucosamine
M01AX07 Benzydamine
M01AX12 Glucosaminoglycan polysulfate
M01AX13 Proquazone
M01AX14 Orgotein
M01AX17 Nimesulide
M01AX18 Feprazone
M01AX21 Diacerein
M01AX22 Morniflumate
M01AX23 Tenidap
M01AX24 Oxaceprol
M01AX25 Chondroitin sulfate
M01AX26 Avocado and soybean oil, unsaponifiables
QM01AX52 Niflumic acid, combinations
M01AX68 Feprazone, combinations
QM01AX90 Pentosan polysulfate
QM01AX91 Aminopropionitrile
QM01AX92 Grapiprant
QM01AX99 Combinations

== M01B Anti-inflammatory/antirheumatic agents in combination ==
=== M01BA Anti-inflammatory/antirheumatic agents in combination with corticosteroids ===
M01BA01 Phenylbutazone and corticosteroids
M01BA02 Dipyrocetyl and corticosteroids
M01BA03 Acetylsalicylic acid and corticosteroids
QM01BA99 Combinations

== M01C Specific antirheumatic agents ==
=== M01CA Quinolines ===
M01CA03 Oxycinchophen

=== M01CB Gold preparations ===
M01CB01 Sodium aurothiomalate
M01CB02 Sodium aurothiosulfate
M01CB03 Auranofin
M01CB04 Aurothioglucose
M01CB05 Aurotioprol

=== M01CC Penicillamine and similar agents ===
M01CC01 Penicillamine
M01CC02 Bucillamine
