= C19H17ClN2O4 =

The molecular formula C_{19}H_{17}ClN_{2}O_{4} may refer to:

- Glafenine, a nonsteroidal anti-inflammatory drug, with risk of anaphylaxis and acute kidney failure
- Oxametacin, a non-steroidal anti-inflammatory drug
- Quizalofop-P-ethyl, an herbicide
