= C16H20N4O2 =

The molecular formula C_{16}H_{20}N_{4}O_{2} (molar mass: 300.36 g/mol, exact mass: 300.1586 u) may refer to:

- Azapropazone
- BIA 10-2474
- Itasetron
