= Tenidap =

Chemical compound

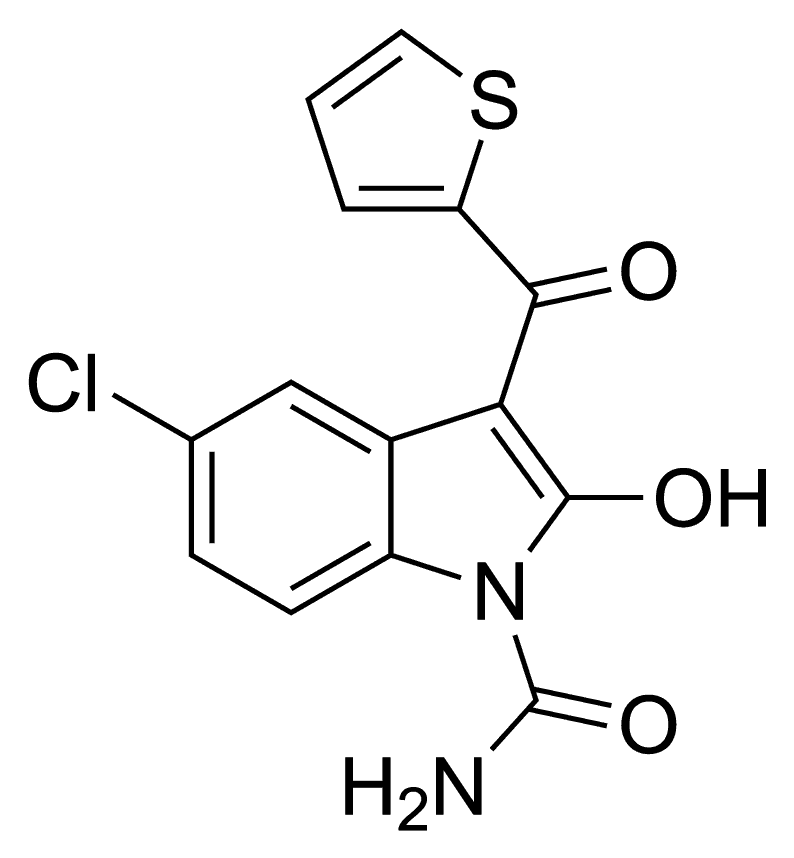

Clinical data
- ATC code: M01AX23 (WHO)

Identifiers
- IUPAC name: 5-chloro-2-hydroxy-3-(2-thienylcarbonyl)-1H-indole-1-carboxamide
- CAS Number: 120210-48-2
- PubChem CID: 60712
- DrugBank: DB13481
- ChemSpider: 54717
- UNII: 9K7CJ74ONH
- KEGG: D06072
- ChEMBL: ChEMBL1097558
- CompTox Dashboard (EPA): DTXSID9046104

Chemical and physical data
- Formula: C_{14}H_{9}ClN_{2}O_{3}S
- Molar mass: 320.75 g·mol^{−1}
- 3D model (JSmol): Interactive image
- SMILES: c1cc(sc1)C(=O)c2c3cc(ccc3n(c2O)C(=O)N)Cl
- InChI: InChI=1S/C14H9ClN2O3S/c15-7-3-4-9-8(6-7)11(13(19)17(9)14(16)20)12(18)10-2-1-5-21-10/h1-6,19H,(H2,16,20); Key:IZSFDUMVCVVWKW-UHFFFAOYSA-N

Tenidap was a COX/5-LOX inhibitor and cytokine-modulating anti-inflammatory drug candidate that was under development by Pfizer as a promising potential treatment for rheumatoid arthritis, but Pfizer halted development after marketing approval was rejected by the FDA in 1996 due to liver and kidney toxicity, which was attributed to metabolites of the drug with a thiophene moiety that caused oxidative damage.
