= Sidney M. Wolfe =

American physician (1937–2024)

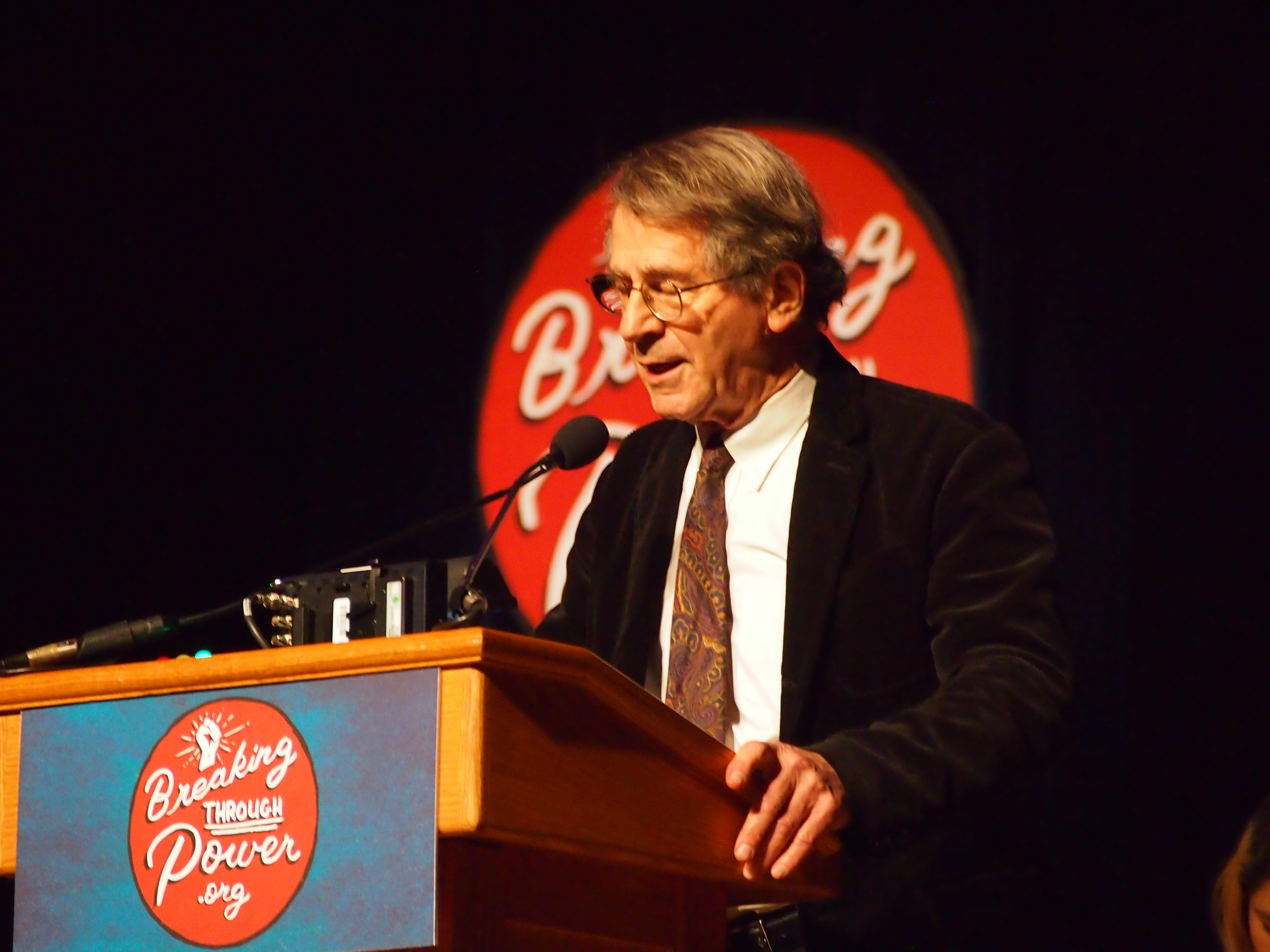
- Sidney in 2016
- Born: Sidney Manuel Wolfe; June 12, 1937; Cleveland, Ohio, U.S.
- Died: January 1, 2024 (aged 86); Washington, D.C., U.S.
- Education: Case Western University
- Occupation: Physician
- Known for: Health Research Group
- Awards: MacArthur Fellows Program

Sidney Manuel Wolfe (June 12, 1937 – January 1, 2024) was an American physician and the co-founder and director of Public Citizen's Health Research Group, a consumer and health advocacy lobbying organization. He publicly crusaded against many pharmaceutical drugs, which he believed to be a danger to public health.

== Early life and education ==
Wolfe was born in Cleveland, Ohio, on June 12, 1937. His father was a workplace safety inspector for the Labor Department and his mother was an English teacher.

In 1959, he received a BA in chemical engineering from Cornell University. While working at a summer job, he received first degree burns from hydrofluoric acid that made him decide not to pursue chemistry as a career. In 1965, he received a medical degree from Western Reserve University (now Case Western Reserve University). He trained under pediatrician Benjamin Spock.

== Career ==
After earning his medical degree at Case Western Reserve University, Cleveland, Ohio, Wolfe completed an internship and residency in internal medicine. Beginning in 1966, he researched blood-clotting and alcoholism at the National Institutes of Health. He met consumer advocate Ralph Nader in Washington, D.C. at a meeting of the American Patients Association, and advised Nader on health problems in the United States. Wolfe co-founded the consumer lobbying organization Health Research Group with Nader in 1971. In March 1971, Wolfe heard about bacterial contamination of intravenous fluid bags made by Abbott Laboratories. The U.S. Food and Drug Administration (FDA), had recommended to continue use of "unless the patient developed an infection". After ensuring that a product recall would not cause a shortage Wolfe and Nader wrote a letter to the FDA demanding such a recall and released this letter to the news media. Two million bags were recalled two days later.

For more than 30 years, Wolfe campaigned to have propoxyphene (Darvon, Darvocet) removed from the American market, because it can cause heart arrhythmias. In 2009, an FDA advisory panel recommended that it be withdrawn from the market. The recommendation to ban the drug was ultimately not upheld and instead manufacturers were required to place additional warning labels on packaging. In 2009, Wolfe was appointed to the FDA's Drug Safety and Risk Management Committee. On November 19, 2010, the FDA recommended against continued prescribing and use of propoxyphene.

Other drugs that Wolfe has campaigned against include Yaz, Yasmin, phenacetin, Oraflex, Zomax, Vioxx, and Crestor.

In 1995, he became an Adjunct Professor of Internal Medicine at the Case Western Reserve University School of Medicine.

From 2008 to 2012, he was a member of the FDA's Drug Safety and Risk Management Committee.

Wolfe was interviewed on television by Phil Donahue, Barbara Walters, Bill Moyers, and Oprah Winfrey, and wrote for the Huffington Post. He was the editor of Health Letter, published since 1985, and Worst Pills Best Pills News, published since 1995.

Wolfe was a member of the Society of General Internal Medicine and the American Public Health Association. He retired from his position as director of the Health Research Group in 2013, He continued in the role of senior adviser until his death.

== Awards ==
- MacArthur Fellows Program (1990)

== Personal life ==
Wolfe was first married to Ava Albert. Together they had four children. The marriage ended in divorce. In 1978, he married Suzanne Goldberg, a clinical psychologist and artist.

Wolfe died of a brain tumor on January 1, 2024, at the age of 86.

== Works ==
=== Books ===
- Off Diabetes Pills: A Diabetic's Guide to Longer Life (1978) with Rebecca Warner; Health Research Group; ISBN 9789996451034
- Pills That Don't Work: A Consumers' and Doctors' Guide to Over 600 Prescription Drugs That Lack Evidence of Effectiveness; Farrar, Straus & Giroux; Revised edition (1981), with Christopher M. Coley & the Health Research Group OL 4259817M, ISBN 9780374233419
- Worst Pills, Best Pills: A Consumer's Guide to Avoiding Drug-Induced Death or Illness (1990), with Larry D. Sasich and Peter Lurie; (Public Citizen Health Service, 1988) ISBN 9780937188514
  - Worst Pills Best Pills II: The Older Adult's Guide to Avoiding Drug-Induced Death or Illness: 119 Pills You Should Not Use: 245 Safer Alternatives (1993), with Rose-Ellen Hope, Paul D. Stolley & the Health Research Group ISBN 9780937188521
  - Worst Pills, Best Pills (1999 edition)ASIN B01FIZEOOY
  - Worst Pills, Best Pills (2005), Simon & Schuster, ISBN 978-0-7434-9256-0
- Torrey, E. Fuller; Stieber, Joan; Ezekiel, Jonathan; Wolfe, Sidney M; Sharfstein, Joshua; Noble, John H; Flynn, Laurie M (1992), Criminalizing the Seriously Mentally Ill: The Abuse of Jails as Mental Hospitals, A joint report of the National Alliance for the Mentally Ill and Public Citizen's Health Research Group, ISBN 0-7881-4279-8
- Unnecessary Cesarean Sections: Curing a National Epidemic State Report for Illinois, with Mary Gabay & the Public Citizen Group (1994) OL 11507865M, ISBN 9780937188552
- Questionable Doctors; Disciplined by States or the Federal Government; Public Citizen Health Research Group; 1996 edition ISBN 9780937188057
  - 2,815 Questionable Doctors; Disciplined by State and Federal Governments, Region 4: California, Hawaii, with Phyllis McCarthy, John Paul Fawcett, and Benita Marcus Adler; Public Citizen's Health Research Group; 2002 edition; ASIN B0014099QQ

=== Articles, book chapters ===
- "Unethical Trials of Interventions to Reduce Perinatal Transmission of the Human Immunodeficiency Virus in Developing Countries", In: Bioethics: An Anthology (2006), Editors: Helga Kuhse, Peter Singer, Wiley-Blackwell, ISBN 978-1-4051-2948-0
- Hines, Jonas Z; Lurie, Peter; Wolfe, Sidney M (2009). "Reply to Lisanby et al.: Post Hoc Analysis Does Not Establish Effectiveness of rTMS for Depression". Neuropsychopharmacol. 34: 2053–2054. doi:10.1038/npp.2009.22. PMID 19528946.
- Hines, JZ; Lurie, P; Yu, E; Wolfe, S (2010). "Left to Their Own Devices: Breakdowns in United States Medical Device Premarket Review". PLOS Med. 7 (7). doi:10.1371/journal.pmed.1000280. PMC 2903853. PMID 20634922. Archived from the original on July 6, 2022.
