= Kebuzone =

NSAID anti-inflammatory medication

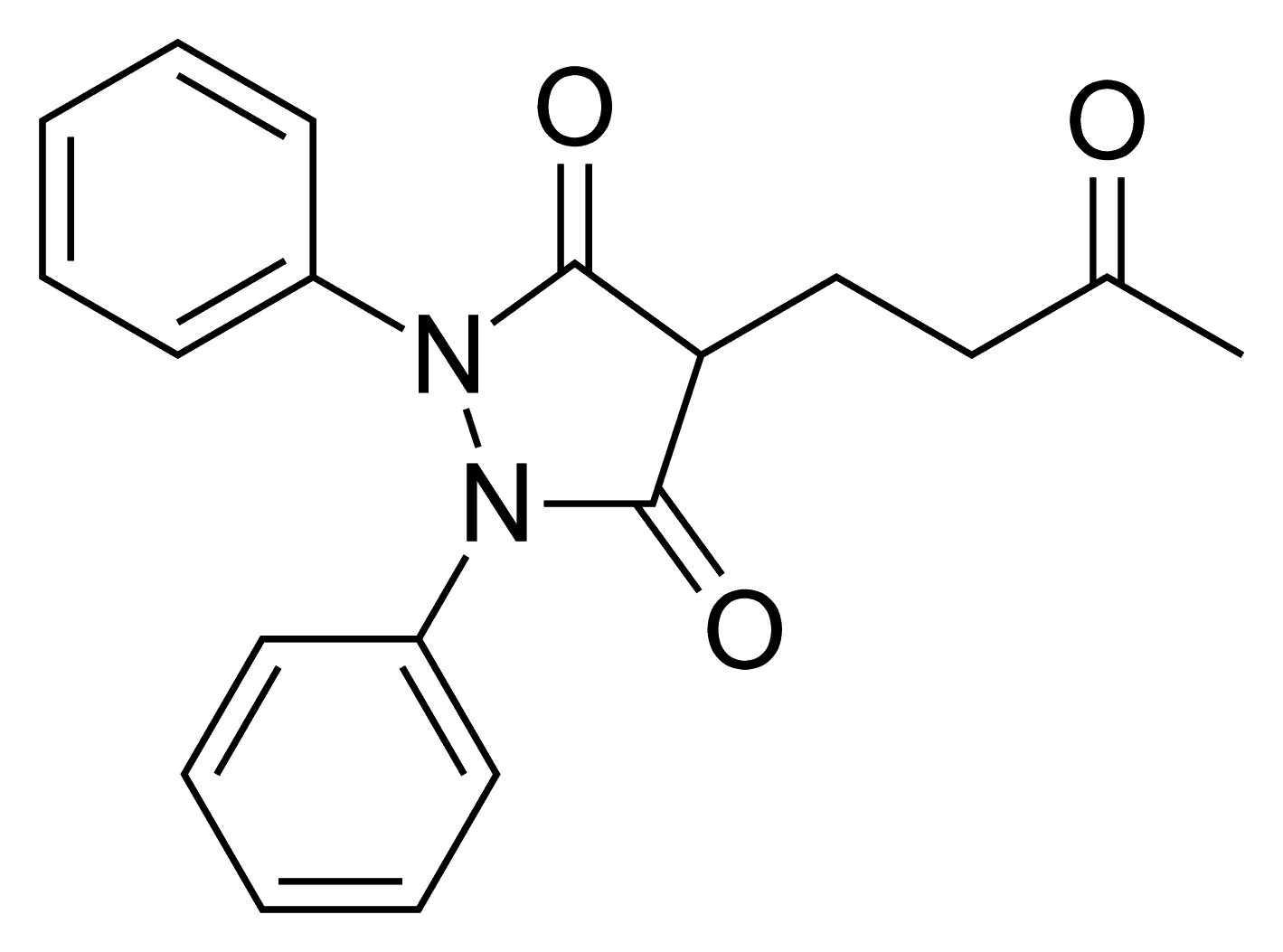

Clinical data
- Routes of administration: intramuscular
- ATC code: M01AA06 (WHO)

Pharmacokinetic data
- Elimination half-life: 70–100 hours
- Excretion: renal

Identifiers
- IUPAC name: 4-(3-oxobutyl)-1,2-di(phenyl)pyrazolidine-3,5-dione
- CAS Number: 853-34-9
- PubChem CID: 3824
- DrugBank: DB08940
- ChemSpider: 3692
- UNII: 4VD83UL6Y6
- KEGG: D01567
- ChEBI: CHEBI:31749
- CompTox Dashboard (EPA): DTXSID00234500
- ECHA InfoCard: 100.011.560

Chemical and physical data
- Formula: C_{19}H_{18}N_{2}O_{3}
- Molar mass: 322.364 g·mol^{−1}
- 3D model (JSmol): Interactive image
- SMILES: CC(=O)CCC1C(=O)N(N(C1=O)C2=CC=CC=C2)C3=CC=CC=C3
- InChI: InChI=1S/C19H18N2O3/c1-14(22)12-13-17-18(23)20(15-8-4-2-5-9-15)21(19(17)24)16-10-6-3-7-11-16/h2-11,17H,12-13H2,1H3; Key:LGYTZKPVOAIUKX-UHFFFAOYSA-N

Kebuzone (or ketophenylbutazone) is a nonsteroidal anti-inflammatory drug (NSAID) that is used for the treatment of inflammatory conditions such as thrombophlebitis and rheumatoid arthritis (RA).
