= Tepoxalin =

NSAID anti-inflammatory veterinary drug

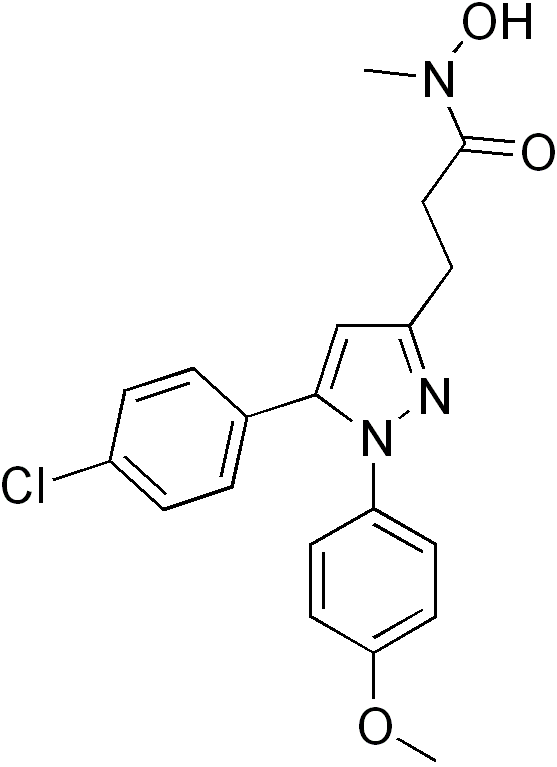

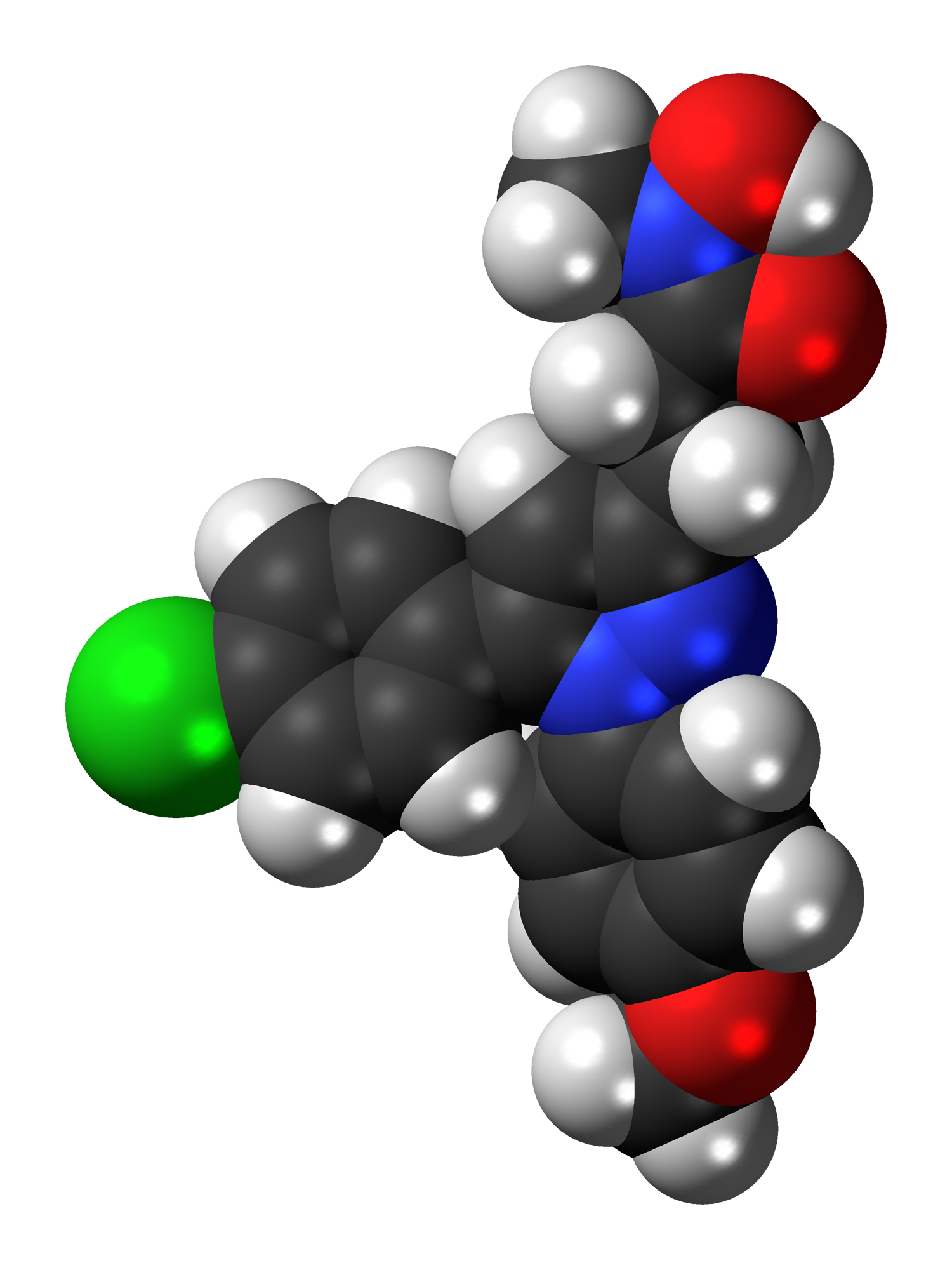

Clinical data
- AHFS/Drugs.com: International Drug Names
- Routes of administration: Oral
- ATCvet code: QM01AE92 (WHO)

Legal status
- Legal status: CA: ℞-only; US: ℞-only

Identifiers
- IUPAC name: 3-[5-(4-Chlorophenyl)-1-(4-methoxyphenyl)pyrazol-3-yl]-N-hydroxy-N-methylpropanamide
- CAS Number: 103475-41-8
- PubChem CID: 59757
- ChemSpider: 53906
- UNII: TZ4OX61974
- KEGG: D06075
- ChEBI: CHEBI:76277
- CompTox Dashboard (EPA): DTXSID1057610
- ECHA InfoCard: 100.166.553

Chemical and physical data
- Formula: C_{20}H_{20}ClN_{3}O_{3}
- Molar mass: 385.85 g·mol^{−1}
- 3D model (JSmol): Interactive image
- SMILES: CN(C(=O)CCc1cc(n(n1)c2ccc(cc2)OC)c3ccc(cc3)Cl)O
- InChI: InChI=1S/C20H20ClN3O3/c1-23(26)20(25)12-7-16-13-19(14-3-5-15(21)6-4-14)24(22-16)17-8-10-18(27-2)11-9-17/h3-6,8-11,13,26H,7,12H2,1-2H3; Key:XYKWNRUXCOIMFZ-UHFFFAOYSA-N

Tepoxalin, formerly sold under the brand name Zubrin, is a non-steroidal anti-flammatory drug (NSAID).

Tepoxalin was withdrawn from the American market by the manufacturer and is not marketed by any manufacturer as of 2024.

Tepoxalin was used as anti-inflammatory and analgesic in the dog prior to withdrawal.

== Approval ==
Tepoxalin received FDA approval for use in the dog in 1998.

Tepoxalin was taken off the market by the manufacturer in the US. However, it still has Food and Drug Administration (FDA) approval. As of 2024 it is no marketed by any manufacturer.

== Pharmacology ==
The drug works as a nonsteroidal anti-inflammatory drug (NSAID). It inhibits both cyclooxygenase and lipoxygenase enzymes suppressing biosynthesis of prostaglandins and leukotrienes, respectively. In vitro results have shown it be more selective for cyclooxygenase-1. It is highly protein bound.

The half-life of tepoxalin in the dog is 2 hours, with a 13 hour half-life for the acid metabolite.

== Use ==
Tepoxalin was used to treat both acute and chronic pain and inflammation. Tepoxalin has been used for surgical pain but its primary use was for osteoarthritis. Tepoxalin has been shown to be more effective than meloxicam and carprofen for intraarticular inflammation and ocular inflammation but less effective for dermatitis and ineffective for respiratory disease.

Adverse effects are similar to other NSAIDs and relate to the gastrointestinal system. Common adverse effects are emesis, diarrhoea, nausea, and gastric ulceration. Studies have not shown haemostatic or renal effects, although these are likely to occur at high enough doses. The LD50 is unknown but doses up to 30 times the recommended amount have been given to dogs without serious adverse effect and doses of 10mg/kg did not produce adverse effect in cats.

Tepoxalin was never investigated in large animals.
