= Ibuproxam =

Chemical compound

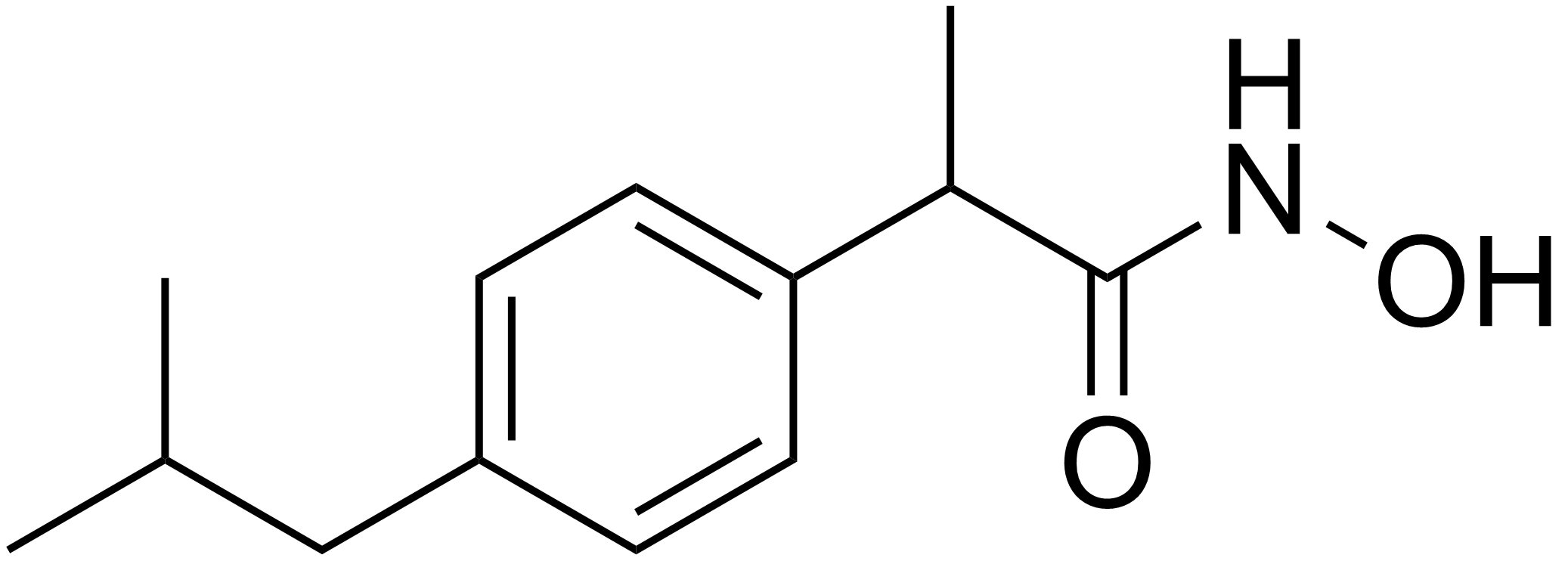

Clinical data
- ATC code: M01AE13 (WHO)

Identifiers
- IUPAC name: N-Hydroxy-2-[4-(2-methylpropyl)phenyl]propanamide
- CAS Number: 53648-05-8
- PubChem CID: 68704
- DrugBank: DB08955
- ChemSpider: 61955
- UNII: O3LD16O96Z
- KEGG: D07268
- ChEBI: CHEBI:76160
- ChEMBL: ChEMBL292707
- CompTox Dashboard (EPA): DTXSID30866353
- ECHA InfoCard: 100.053.331

Chemical and physical data
- Formula: C_{13}H_{19}NO_{2}
- Molar mass: 221.300 g·mol^{−1}
- 3D model (JSmol): Interactive image
- Melting point: 119–121 °C (246–250 °F)
- SMILES: O=C(NO)C(c1ccc(cc1)CC(C)C)C
- InChI: InChI=1S/C13H19NO2/c1-9(2)8-11-4-6-12(7-5-11)10(3)13(15)14-16/h4-7,9-10,16H,8H2,1-3H3,(H,14,15); Key:BYPIURIATSUHDW-UHFFFAOYSA-N

Ibuproxam is a nonsteroidal anti-inflammatory drug (NSAID).It is the hydroxamic acid of ibuprofen to which it is hydrolyzed in the blood. It was found, that ibuproxam is considerably less damaging to the gastrointestinal tract than is ibuprofen. The analgesic and the antipyretic activities are consistent.
