= Pirprofen =

Chemical compound

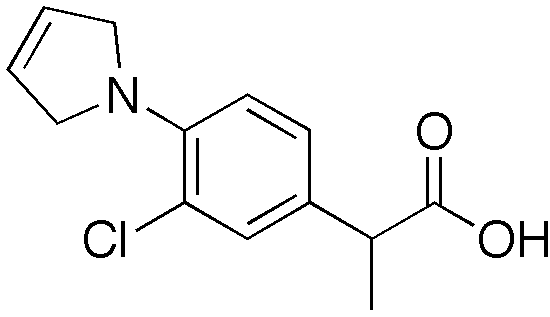

Clinical data
- ATC code: M01AE08 (WHO)

Identifiers
- IUPAC name: 2-[3-chloro-4-(2,5-dihydro-1H-pyrrol-1-yl)phenyl]propanoic acid
- CAS Number: 31793-07-4
- PubChem CID: 35935
- ChemSpider: 33051
- UNII: T7KN291890
- KEGG: D05515
- ChEMBL: ChEMBL188952
- CompTox Dashboard (EPA): DTXSID7023489
- ECHA InfoCard: 100.046.172

Chemical and physical data
- Formula: C_{13}H_{14}ClNO_{2}
- Molar mass: 251.71 g·mol^{−1}
- 3D model (JSmol): Interactive image
- SMILES: O=C(O)C(c1cc(Cl)c(cc1)N2C/C=C\C2)C
- InChI: InChI=1S/C13H14ClNO2/c1-9(13(16)17)10-4-5-12(11(14)8-10)15-6-2-3-7-15/h2-5,8-9H,6-7H2,1H3,(H,16,17); Key:PIDSZXPFGCURGN-UHFFFAOYSA-N

Pirprofen was a nonsteroidal anti-inflammatory drug (NSAID) that was brought to market by Ciba-Geigy in 1982 as a treatment for arthritis and pain. Its label was restricted after adverse events arose, including some cases of fatal liver toxicity. Ciba-Geigy voluntarily withdrew the drug from the market worldwide in 1990.
