= Lonazolac =

Chemical compound

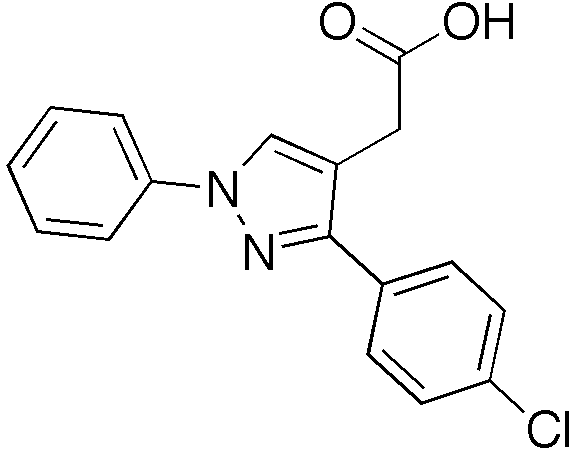

Clinical data
- ATC code: M01AB09 (WHO)

Identifiers
- IUPAC name: [3-(4-chlorophenyl)-1-phenyl-1H-pyrazol-4-yl]acetic acid
- CAS Number: 53808-88-1
- PubChem CID: 68706
- ChemSpider: 61957
- UNII: 13097143QI
- KEGG: D07265
- ChEBI: CHEBI:76164
- CompTox Dashboard (EPA): DTXSID4046151
- ECHA InfoCard: 100.053.428

Chemical and physical data
- Formula: C_{17}H_{13}ClN_{2}O_{2}
- Molar mass: 312.75 g·mol^{−1}
- 3D model (JSmol): Interactive image
- SMILES: c1ccc(cc1)n2cc(c(n2)c3ccc(cc3)Cl)CC(=O)O
- InChI: InChI=1S/C17H13ClN2O2/c18-14-8-6-12(7-9-14)17-13(10-16(21)22)11-20(19-17)15-4-2-1-3-5-15/h1-9,11H,10H2,(H,21,22); Key:XVUQHFRQHBLHQD-UHFFFAOYSA-N

Lonazolac is a nonsteroidal anti-inflammatory drug (NSAID).
