= Polmacoxib =

COX-2 selective NSAID medication

Clinical data
- Trade names: Acelex
- Other names: CG100649
- ATC code: M01AH07 (WHO)

Identifiers
- IUPAC name: 4-(3-(3-Fluorophenyl)-5,5-dimethyl-4-oxo-4,5-dihydrofuran-2-yl)-benzenesulfonamide
- CAS Number: 301692-76-2
- PubChem CID: 9841854
- ChemSpider: 8017569
- UNII: IJ34D6YPAO
- KEGG: D10656
- ChEMBL: ChEMBL166863
- CompTox Dashboard (EPA): DTXSID901029389

Chemical and physical data
- Formula: C_{18}H_{16}FNO_{4}S
- Molar mass: 361.39 g·mol^{−1}
- 3D model (JSmol): Interactive image
- SMILES: CC1(C(=O)C(=C(O1)C2=CC=C(C=C2)S(=O)(=O)N)C3=CC(=CC=C3)F)C
- InChI: InChI=1S/C18H16FNO4S/c1-18(2)17(21)15(12-4-3-5-13(19)10-12)16(24-18)11-6-8-14(9-7-11)25(20,22)23/h3-10H,1-2H3,(H2,20,22,23); Key:IJWPAFMIFNSIGD-UHFFFAOYSA-N

Polmacoxib (trade name Acelex) is a nonsteroidal anti-inflammatory drug (NSAID) used to treat osteoarthritis. It was developed as CG100649 and approved for use in South Korea in February 2015. It inhibits the enzymes carbonic anhydrase and COX-2. A study in healthy volunteers showed drug effects on urinary prostaglandin metabolites for both polmacoxib and celecoxib that suggest a similar cardiovascular risk profile. Further work by this group developed dose-exposure relationships of polmacoxib to guide clinical development strategies.
