= Firocoxib =

COX-2 selective NSAID veterinary drug

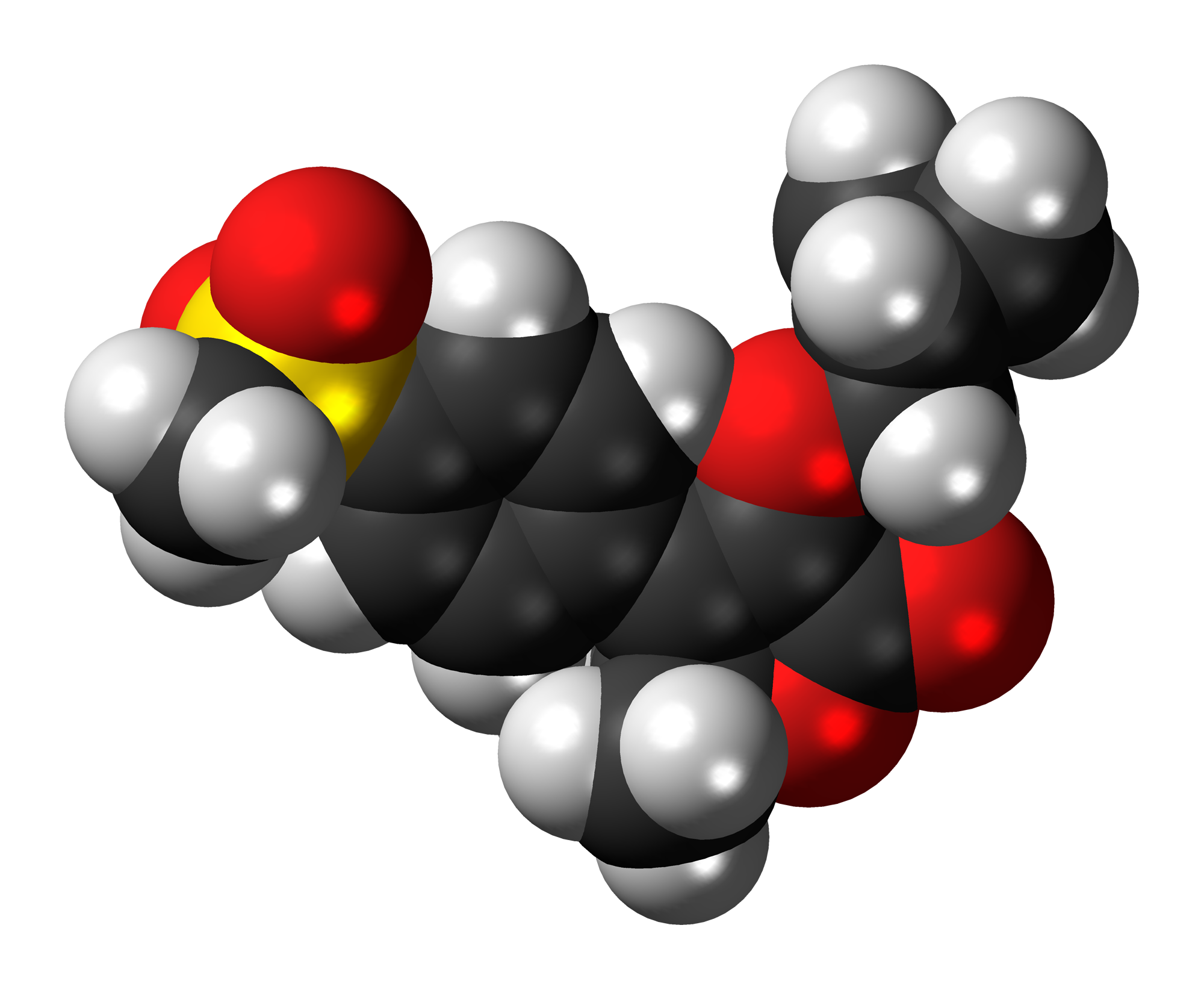

Clinical data
- Trade names: Equioxx, Previcox
- AHFS/Drugs.com: Veterinary Use; Veterinary Use
- License data: US DailyMed: Firocoxib
- Routes of administration: By mouth
- ATCvet code: QM01AH90 (WHO)

Legal status
- Legal status: AU: S4 (Prescription only); CA: ℞-only; UK: POM (Prescription only); US: ℞-only; EU: Rx-only

Identifiers
- IUPAC name: 3-(Cyclopropylmethoxy)-5,5-dimethyl-4-(4-methylsulfonylphenyl)furan-2-one
- CAS Number: 189954-96-9
- PubChem CID: 208910
- DrugBank: DB09217
- ChemSpider: 181008
- UNII: Y6V2W4S4WT
- KEGG: D03712
- ChEBI: CHEBI:76136
- ChEMBL: ChEMBL69998
- CompTox Dashboard (EPA): DTXSID40870188

Chemical and physical data
- Formula: C_{17}H_{20}O_{5}S
- Molar mass: 336.40 g·mol^{−1}
- 3D model (JSmol): Interactive image
- SMILES: O=C2OC(C(=C2\OCC1CC1)\c3ccc(cc3)S(=O)(=O)C)(C)C
- InChI: InChI=1S/C17H20O5S/c1-17(2)14(12-6-8-13(9-7-12)23(3,19)20)15(16(18)22-17)21-10-11-4-5-11/h6-9,11H,4-5,10H2,1-3H3; Key:FULAPETWGIGNMT-UHFFFAOYSA-N

Firocoxib, sold under the brand names Equioxx and Previcox among others, is a nonsteroidal anti-inflammatory drug of the COX-2 inhibitor (coxib) class, approved for use in horses (Equioxx) and for use in dogs (Previcox). Firocoxib was the first COX-2 inhibitor approved by the U.S. Food and Drug Administration for horses. Firocoxib is not intended or approved for use in human medicine.

Firocoxib, manufactured by Merial, was approved for veterinary use in the United States for dogs in July 2004, and for horses in July 2007, as an oral paste (Equioxx) and July 2016, as tablets.

Firocoxib is also available as a generic medication for horses and for dogs.
