= Oxaprozin =

Chemical compound

Clinical data
- Trade names: Daypro, Dayrun, Duraprox, others
- AHFS/Drugs.com: Monograph
- MedlinePlus: a693002
- Pregnancy category: C
- Routes of administration: By mouth
- ATC code: M01AE12 (WHO)

Legal status
- Legal status: AU: S4 (Prescription only); In general: ℞ (Prescription only)

Pharmacokinetic data
- Bioavailability: 95%
- Protein binding: 99%
- Metabolism: Liver—65% oxidation and 35% glucuronic acid conjugation. 5% are active phenolic metabolites.
- Elimination half-life: 54.9 hours

Identifiers
- IUPAC name: 3-(4,5-diphenyl-1,3-oxazol-2-yl)propanoic acid
- CAS Number: 21256-18-8
- PubChem CID: 4614
- IUPHAR/BPS: 7252
- DrugBank: DB00991
- ChemSpider: 4453
- UNII: MHJ80W9LRB
- KEGG: D00463
- ChEBI: CHEBI:7822
- ChEMBL: ChEMBL1071
- CompTox Dashboard (EPA): DTXSID1045118
- ECHA InfoCard: 100.040.254

Chemical and physical data
- Formula: C_{18}H_{15}NO_{3}
- Molar mass: 293.322 g·mol^{−1}
- 3D model (JSmol): Interactive image
- SMILES: O=C(O)CCc1nc(c(o1)c2ccccc2)c3ccccc3
- InChI: InChI=1S/C18H15NO3/c20-16(21)12-11-15-19-17(13-7-3-1-4-8-13)18(22-15)14-9-5-2-6-10-14/h1-10H,11-12H2,(H,20,21); Key:OFPXSFXSNFPTHF-UHFFFAOYSA-N

Oxaprozin, also known as oxaprozinum, is a nonsteroidal anti-inflammatory drug (NSAID), used to relieve the inflammation, swelling, stiffness, and joint pain associated with osteoarthritis and rheumatoid arthritis. Chemically, it is a propionic acid derivative. Safety and efficacy has been established in children over 6 years with juvenile rheumatoid arthritis only, and there is an increased risk of adverse reactions in the elderly population.

It was patented in 1967 and approved for medical use in 1983.

== Medical uses ==
In 2015, oxaprozin was one of twenty NSAIDs included in a clinical trial to compare the efficacy of NSAIDs in the short-term treatment of ankylosing spondylitis (AS). The NSAIDs were compared by completing randomized controlled trials of NSAIDs in patients with active AS. Efficacy reported at 2–12 weeks and adverse effects were examined. Efficacy was measured by change in pain score and change in the duration of morning stiffness. A total of 26 trials with a total of 3410 participants were completed (58% of the trials had fewer than 50 participants). While all 20 NSAIDs were found to reduce more pain than the placebo, 15 were found to be significantly better. In regards to the decrease of morning stiffness and the likelihood of adverse events, there was no significant difference between NSAIDs. It was concluded that etoricoxib was more effective in reducing pain of AS, however due to small studies and insufficient evidence, no one NSAID could be determined to be the most effective treatment of AS. After etoricoxib, patients taking oxaprozin experienced the least amount of pain with fewer adverse effects than naproxen.

== Adverse effects ==
In October 2020, the U.S. Food and Drug Administration (FDA) required the prescribing information to be updated for all nonsteroidal anti-inflammatory medications to describe the risk of kidney problems in unborn babies that result in low amniotic fluid. They recommend avoiding NSAIDs in pregnant women at 20 weeks or later in pregnancy.

== History ==
Oxaprozin was developed and patented by Wyeth-Ayerst. The US patent 3578671, Oxazoles, was filed November 6, 1967 and published May 11, 1971. Following the filing of the patent, the first description of oxaprozin exhibiting anti-inflammatory properties was outlined in the article Diaryloxazole and diaylthiazolealkanoci acids: two novel series of non-steroidal anti-inflammatory agents. This article was published in Nature in 1968. In December 1988, Wyeth-Ayerst licensed the marketing rights for the US, Canada, Puerto Rico, and the Caribbean to Searle.

Daypro became available January 5, 1993. Upon its release, “The Pink Sheet” estimated that the average whole sale price of Searle's Daypro was $112.30 for 100 (600 mg) tablets. The price was comparable to other prescription NSAIDs.

== Society and culture ==
=== FDA approval ===
The oxaprozin new drug application (NDA 18-841) was submitted to the FDA on August 10, 1982. The drug was granted an “NDA Day” review on June 15–16, 1992. After Searle agreed to complete seven Phase IV postmarketing studies on October 22, the FDA approved Daypro on October 29, 1992.

Since the approval of Daypro by Searle, other companies have submitted abbreviated new drug applications (ANDAs) to the FDA. Daypro by Searle is listed as the Reference Listed Drug to prove the bioequivalence of the ANDAs. Below is a table listing all of the approved oxaprozin products.

Company	FDA Approval Date
GD Searle	Oct 29, 1992
Apotex Inc	Sep 2, 2004
Dr. Reddy's Labs LTD	Jan 31, 2001
Ivax Sub Teva	May 13, 2002
Sandoz	Jan 31, 2002
Sun Pharm Inds Inc	Jan 3, 2002
Teva	Jul 3, 2002

=== Recalls ===
Advantage Dose LLC recalled oxaprozin tablets on November 26, 2008. The company was not in conformance with cGMP. (Recall #D-837-2009)
