= Robenacoxib =

COX-2 selective NSAID veterinary drug

Clinical data
- Trade names: Onsior
- ATCvet code: QM01AH91 (WHO)

Legal status
- Legal status: CA: ℞-only; US: ℞-only; EU: Rx-only

Identifiers
- IUPAC name: {5-Ethyl-2-[(2,3,5,6-tetrafluorophenyl)amino]phenyl}acetic acid
- CAS Number: 220991-32-2
- PubChem CID: 6433107
- DrugBank: DB11455
- ChemSpider: 4938295
- UNII: Z588009C7C
- ChEBI: CHEBI:76269
- ChEMBL: ChEMBL2107774
- CompTox Dashboard (EPA): DTXSID90176607
- ECHA InfoCard: 100.210.035

Chemical and physical data
- Formula: C_{16}H_{13}F_{4}NO_{2}
- Molar mass: 327.279 g·mol^{−1}
- 3D model (JSmol): Interactive image
- SMILES: O=C(O)Cc2c(Nc1c(F)c(F)cc(F)c1F)ccc(c2)CC
- InChI: InChI=1S/C16H13F4NO2/c1-2-8-3-4-12(9(5-8)6-13(22)23)21-16-14(19)10(17)7-11(18)15(16)20/h3-5,7,21H,2,6H2,1H3,(H,22,23); Key:ZEXGDYFACFXQPF-UHFFFAOYSA-N

Robenacoxib, sold under the brand name Onsior, is a nonsteroidal anti-inflammatory drug (NSAID) used in veterinary medicine for the relief of pain and inflammation in cats and dogs. It is a COX-2 inhibitor (coxib).
