= Bumadizone =

Chemical compound

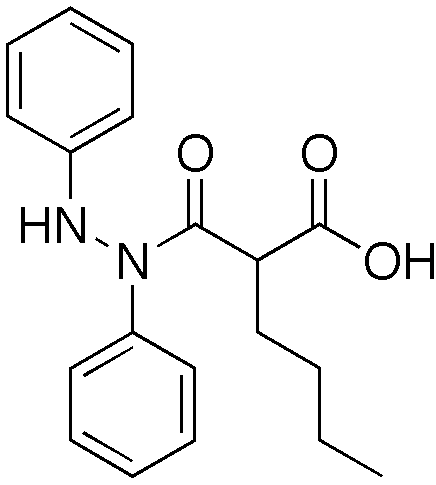

Clinical data
- AHFS/Drugs.com: International Drug Names
- ATC code: M01AB07 (WHO)

Identifiers
- IUPAC name: 2-[phenyl-(phenylamino)carbamoyl]hexanoic acid
- CAS Number: 3583-64-0
- PubChem CID: 19161
- ChemSpider: 18080
- UNII: ATD81G944M
- ChEBI: CHEBI:76119
- ChEMBL: ChEMBL2105456
- CompTox Dashboard (EPA): DTXSID0022698
- ECHA InfoCard: 100.020.646

Chemical and physical data
- Formula: C_{19}H_{22}N_{2}O_{3}
- Molar mass: 326.396 g·mol^{−1}
- 3D model (JSmol): Interactive image
- SMILES: O=C(O)C(C(=O)N(Nc1ccccc1)c2ccccc2)CCCC
- InChI: InChI=1S/C19H22N2O3/c1-2-3-14-17(19(23)24)18(22)21(16-12-8-5-9-13-16)20-15-10-6-4-7-11-15/h4-13,17,20H,2-3,14H2,1H3,(H,23,24); Key:FLWFHHFTIRLFPV-UHFFFAOYSA-N

Bumadizone, or bumazidone, is a nonsteroidal anti-inflammatory drug (NSAID).
