= Alminoprofen =

Chemical compound

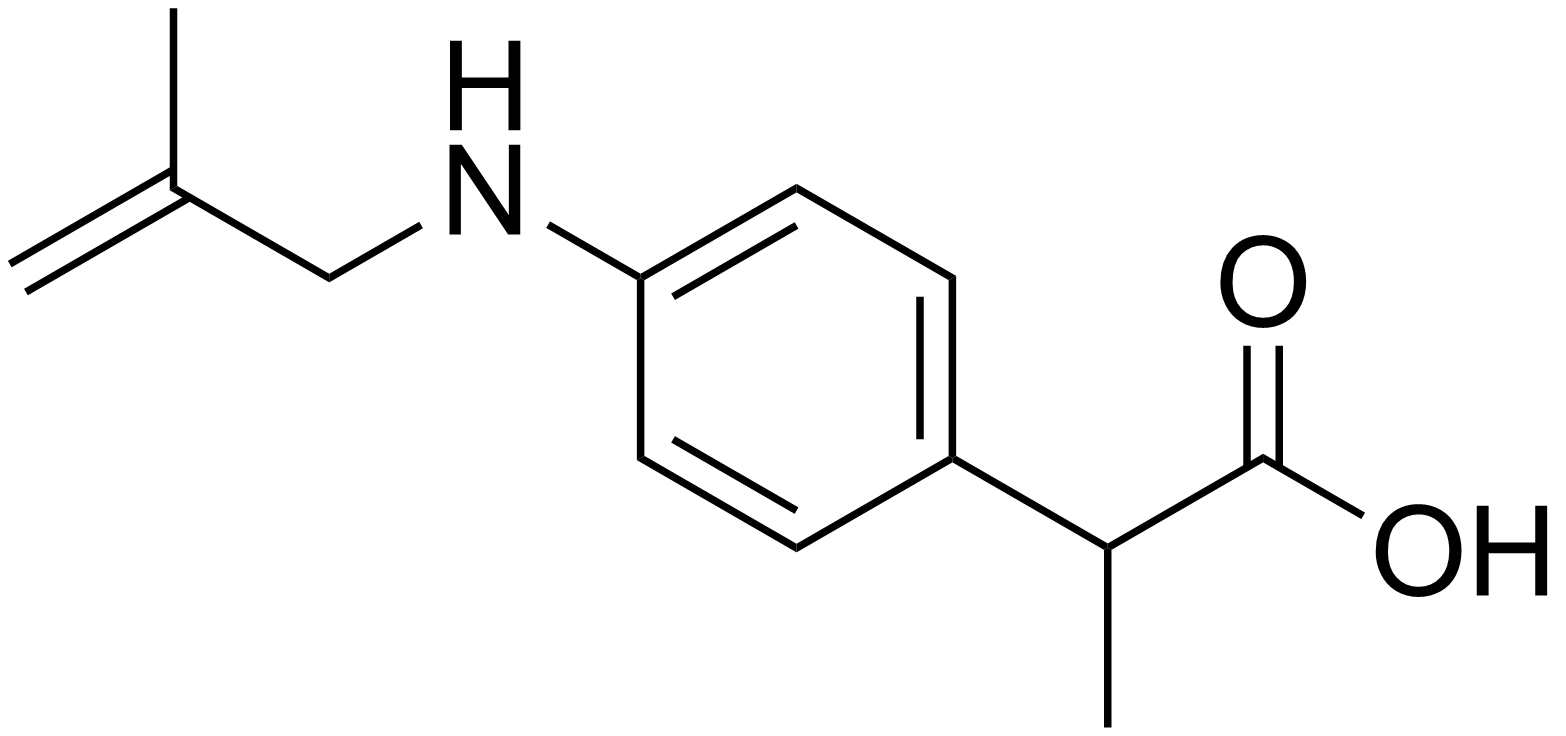

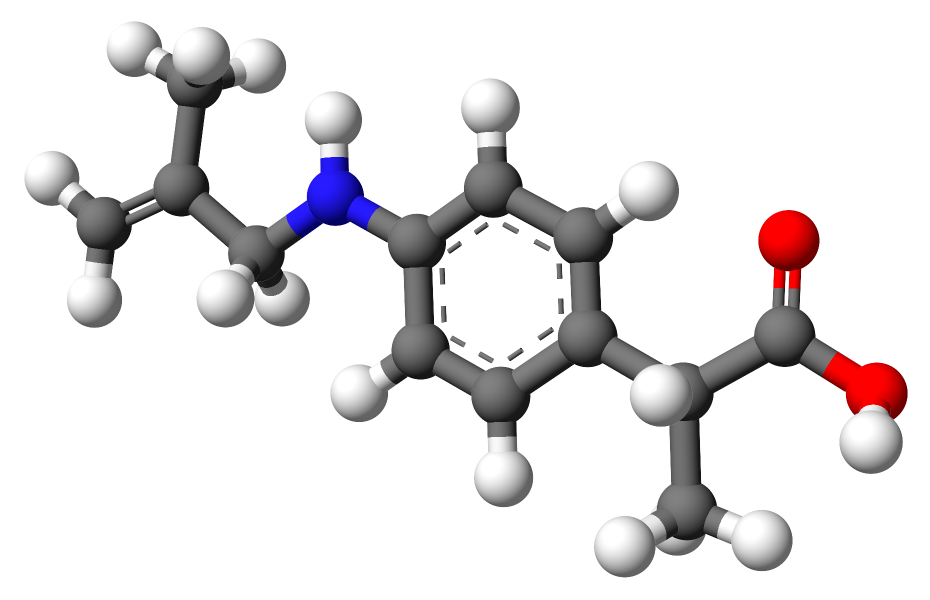

Clinical data
- AHFS/Drugs.com: International Drug Names
- ATC code: M01AE16 (WHO)

Identifiers
- IUPAC name: 2-{{#parsoidfragment:1}}{4-[(2-Methylprop-2-en-1-yl)amino]phenyl}propanoic acid
- CAS Number: 39718-89-3
- PubChem CID: 2097
- ChemSpider: 2013
- UNII: 0255AHR9GJ
- KEGG: D01513
- ChEBI: CHEBI:31190
- ChEMBL: ChEMBL1765293
- CompTox Dashboard (EPA): DTXSID90865968
- ECHA InfoCard: 100.049.622

Chemical and physical data
- Formula: C_{13}H_{17}NO_{2}
- Molar mass: 219.284 g·mol^{−1}
- 3D model (JSmol): Interactive image
- SMILES: O=C(O)C(c1ccc(NC/C(=C)C)cc1)C
- InChI: InChI=1S/C13H17NO2/c1-9(2)8-14-12-6-4-11(5-7-12)10(3)13(15)16/h4-7,10,14H,1,8H2,2-3H3,(H,15,16); Key:FPHLBGOJWPEVME-UHFFFAOYSA-N

Alminoprofen is a non-steroidal anti-inflammatory drug. the non-proprietary name alminoprofen is derived from the compound's chemical name 2-(4-[{2-methylallyl}amino]phenyl)propanic acid.

== Stereochemistry ==
Alminoprofen exists as two enantiomers; the stereocenter is located at the benzyl group.

== Pharmacology ==
Although the pharmacology of non-steroidal anti-inflammatory drugs (non-steroidal anti-inflammatory drug) has been extensively studied, their mechanisms of action at the immunological level are not yet fully understood. Alminoprofen is a newer NSAID with a characteristic anti-inflammatory profile mediated through inhibition of cyclooxygenases and phospholipase A2 activity.

=== Comparison with ibuprofen ===
The effects of alminoprofen were examined in animal studies and compared with those of ibuprofen. At a dose of 30 mg/kg administered intraduodenally, alminoprofen significantly suppressed passive anaphylactic reaction-induced bronchoconstriction, whereas ibuprofen at the same dose did not. In vitro studies demonstrated that alminoprofen, unlike ibuprofen, inhibits arachidonate-5-lipoxygenase activity, which initiates the biosynthesis of leukotrienes. Alminoprofen inhibited arachidonic acid-induced ear edema in mice and homologous passive cutaneous anaphylaxis in rats at high doses, whereas ibuprofen showed no such effect at comparable doses.

== Synthesis ==
The multistep synthesis of alminoprofen is shown in the following reaction sequence:

Synthesis of alminoprofen

Enantiomeric forms (R)-(-)-alminoprofen (top) and (S)-(+)-alminoprofen (bottom)

The synthesis begins with para-nitrophenylacetic acid as the starting material. The first step is a Mannich reaction with formaldehyde and dimethylamine. The second step is an elimination reaction forming a terminal alkene. In the third step, both the alkene and the nitro group are reduced using palladium on carbon as the catalyst and hydrogen as the reducing agent. The final step is a nucleophilic substitution in which the aryl group amine acts as the nucleophile. The product is a racemate.

== Trade names ==
- Minalfen (J)
