= Deracoxib =

NSAID analgesic veterinary drug

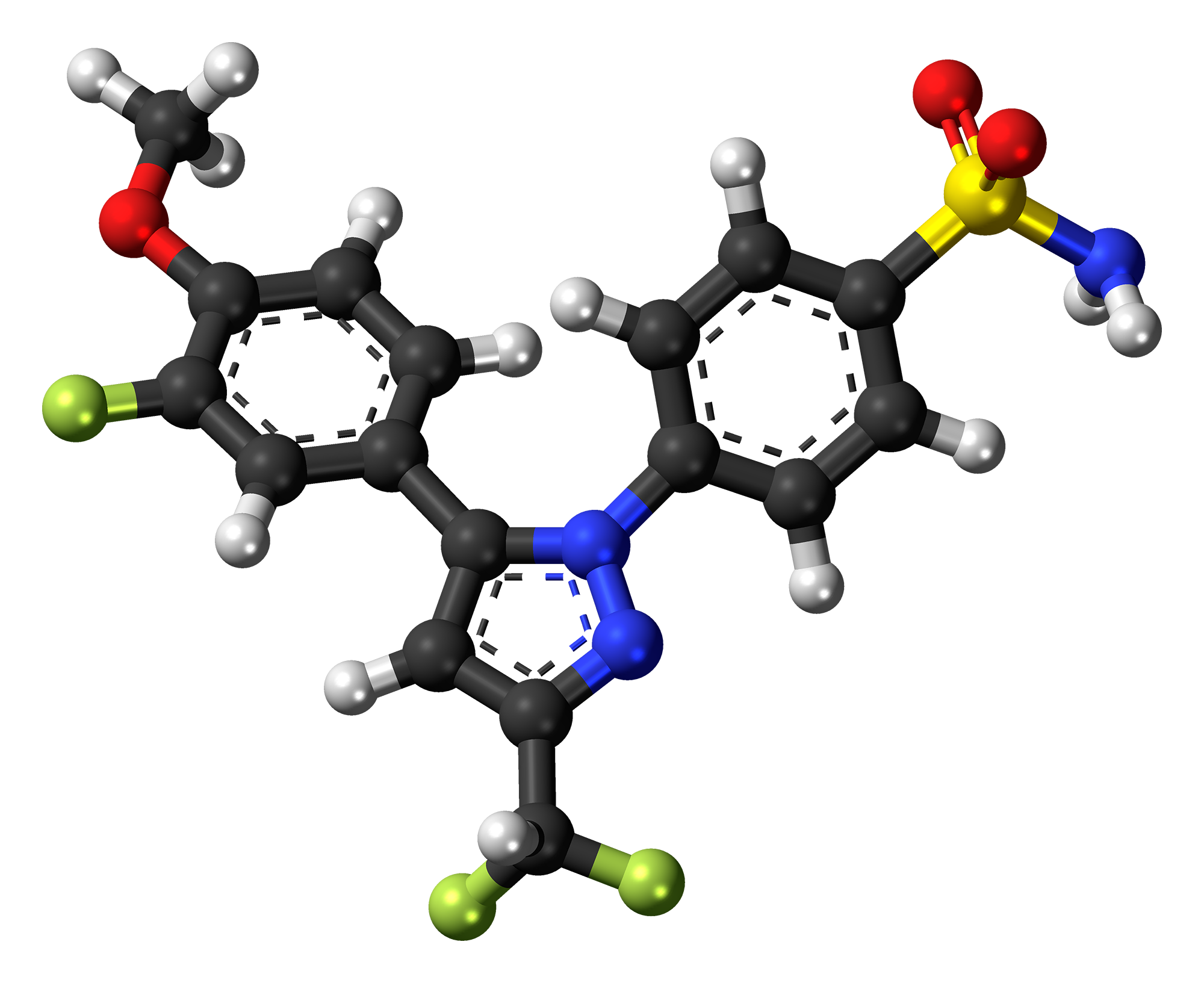

Clinical data
- Trade names: Deramaxx
- AHFS/Drugs.com: International Drug Names
- Routes of administration: Oral
- Drug class: Nonsteroidal anti-inflammatory drug (NSAID)
- ATCvet code: QM01AH94 (WHO)

Legal status
- Legal status: Veterinary use only

Pharmacokinetic data
- Protein binding: High (more than 90%)
- Metabolism: Hepatic biotransformation
- Elimination half-life: 3 hours at 2–3 mg/kg
- Excretion: In feces

Identifiers
- IUPAC name: 4-[3-(Difluoromethyl)-5-(3-fluoro-4-methoxyphenyl)-1H-pyrazole-1-yl] benzenesulfonamide
- CAS Number: 169590-41-4
- PubChem CID: 3058754
- ChemSpider: 2319853
- UNII: VX29JB5XWV
- ChEBI: CHEBI:73032
- ChEMBL: ChEMBL28636
- CompTox Dashboard (EPA): DTXSID4045975
- ECHA InfoCard: 100.234.875

Chemical and physical data
- Formula: C_{17}H_{14}F_{3}N_{3}O_{3}S
- Molar mass: 397.37 g·mol^{−1}
- 3D model (JSmol): Interactive image
- SMILES: O=S(=O)(c3ccc(n1nc(cc1c2ccc(OC)c(F)c2)C(F)F)cc3)N
- InChI: InChI=1S/C17H14F3N3O3S/c1-26-16-7-2-10(8-13(16)18)15-9-14(17(19)20)22-23(15)11-3-5-12(6-4-11)27(21,24)25/h2-9,17H,1H3,(H2,21,24,25); Key:WAZQAZKAZLXFMK-UHFFFAOYSA-N

Deracoxib, sold under the brand name Deramaxx, is a nonsteroidal anti-inflammatory drug (NSAID) of the coxib class, used in dogs to treat pain associated with osteoarthritis, or to prevent pain following orthopedic or dental surgery. It is available as beef-flavored tablets.

== Medical uses ==
Deracoxib is used in dogs for the control of pain and inflammation associated with osteoarthritis and for the prevention of pain following orthopedic surgery or dental procedures.

In cats, the use of deracoxib is not recommended.

== Contraindications ==
Deracoxib is contraindicated for treatment of dogs with hypersensitivity to deracoxib or other NSAIDs, and dogs with gastrointestinal ulcers, renal disease, hepatic disorders, hypoproteinemia, dehydration, or cardiovascular disease.

Dogs with renal disease may need dose adjustment (if the benefits of the medication outweigh the risks), while those on concurrent diuretic therapy are at increased risk for NSAID toxicity and should not be given this medication.

The concurrent use of deracoxib with corticosteroids or other NSAIDs should be avoided. The safety of deracoxib has not been established in pregnant or nursing dogs or in dogs younger than 4 months of age.

== Adverse effects ==
The most common adverse effects of treatment with deracoxib are vomiting, anorexia, lethargy, and depression. Other adverse effects of deracoxib are caused by its effects on the gastrointestinal tract, and include erosions or ulcerations of the lining of the stomach or intestines.

Serious adverse effects, including ulcers which perforate the gastrointestinal tract, have occurred in dogs administered higher than recommended doses of deracoxib, or dogs administered deracoxib at the same time as (or soon after) other NSAIDs or corticosteroid medications.

Documented adverse side effects include serious and sometimes fatal organ system damage or failure. Deracoxib can cause increased blood urea nitrogen (BUN) in a dose-dependent manner. Other side effects include increase in drinking or urination, jaundice, bloody or black stools, pale gums, hot spots, increased respiration (fast or heavy breathing), incoordination, and behavior changes.

== Pharmacology ==
Deracoxib is a coxib class nonsteroidal anti-inflammatory drug (NSAID). Like other NSAIDs, its effects are caused by inhibition of cyclooxygenase (COX) enzymes. At the doses used to treat dogs, deracoxib causes greater inhibition of COX-2 than of COX-1, but at doses twice those recommended for use in dogs, deracoxib significantly inhibits COX-1 as well.

In dogs, the half-life of deracoxib at the recommended dose is three hours.

== Society and culture ==
In the U.S., deracoxib was first approved for use in dogs in 2002, under the trade name Deramaxx chewable tablets, sold by Novartis Animal Health.
