= Difenpiramide =

Chemical compound

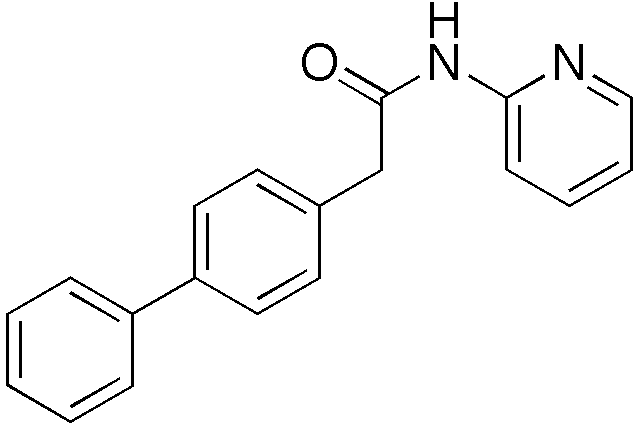

Clinical data
- ATC code: M01AB12 (WHO)

Identifiers
- IUPAC name: 2-(4-phenylphenyl)-N-pyridin-2-ylacetamide
- CAS Number: 51484-40-3
- PubChem CID: 100472
- ChemSpider: 90781
- UNII: Q6U5F6E1QL
- ChEBI: CHEBI:76130
- ChEMBL: ChEMBL1489662
- CompTox Dashboard (EPA): DTXSID10199459
- ECHA InfoCard: 100.052.015

Chemical and physical data
- Formula: C_{19}H_{16}N_{2}O
- Molar mass: 288.350 g·mol^{−1}
- 3D model (JSmol): Interactive image
- SMILES: O=C(Nc1ncccc1)Cc3ccc(c2ccccc2)cc3
- InChI: InChI=1S/C19H16N2O/c22-19(21-18-8-4-5-13-20-18)14-15-9-11-17(12-10-15)16-6-2-1-3-7-16/h1-13H,14H2,(H,20,21,22); Key:PWHROYKAGRUWDQ-UHFFFAOYSA-N

Difenpiramide is a non-steroidal anti-inflammatory drug.
