= Zomepirac =

Withdrawn non-steroidal anti-inflammatory drug

Clinical data
- Routes of administration: By mouth
- ATC code: M01AB04 (WHO)

Legal status
- Legal status: withdrawn

Identifiers
- IUPAC name: 2-[5-(4-Chlorobenzoyl)-1,4-dimethyl-pyrrol-2-yl]acetic acid
- CAS Number: 33369-31-2
- PubChem CID: 5733
- DrugBank: DB04828
- ChemSpider: 5531
- UNII: 822G987U9J
- ChEBI: CHEBI:35859
- ChEMBL: ChEMBL19490
- CompTox Dashboard (EPA): DTXSID9023754
- ECHA InfoCard: 100.046.780

Chemical and physical data
- Formula: C_{15}H_{14}ClNO_{3}
- Molar mass: 291.73 g·mol^{−1}
- 3D model (JSmol): Interactive image
- SMILES: O=C(c1c(cc(n1C)CC(=O)O)C)c2ccc(Cl)cc2
- InChI: InChI=1S/C15H14ClNO3/c1-9-7-12(8-13(18)19)17(2)14(9)15(20)10-3-5-11(16)6-4-10/h3-7H,8H2,1-2H3,(H,18,19); Key:ZXVNMYWKKDOREA-UHFFFAOYSA-N

Zomepirac is an orally effective nonsteroidal anti-inflammatory drug (NSAID) that has antipyretic actions. It was developed by McNeil Pharmaceutical, approved by the FDA in 1980, and sold as the sodium salt zomepirac sodium, under the brand name Zomax. Due to its clinical effectiveness, it was preferred by doctors in many situations and obtained a large share of the analgesics market; however, it was subsequently withdrawn in March 1983 due to its tendency to cause serious anaphylaxis in a small, but unpredictable, subset of the patient population.

== Indications ==
Zomepirac was indicated for the management of mild to severe pain. Multiple clinical trials demonstrated zomepirac to be more effective than aspirin or codeine alone and to be as effective as analgesic combinations containing codeine or other opioids. Zomepirac provided analgesia comparable with usual intramuscular doses of morphine in postoperative pain and that with long-term use, neither tolerance to its analgesic effect nor psychological or physical dependence had been demonstrated.

== Chemical structure ==
Zomepirac is the sodium salt of 5-(4-chlorobenzoyl)-1,4 dimethyl-1H-pyrrole-2-acetate dihydrate. It is a pyrrole-acetic acid which is structurally related to tolmetin. The chemical structure differs from other NSAIDs in that the central benzene ring has been replaced by a pyrrole.

== Mechanism of action ==
Zomepirac is a prostaglandin synthetase inhibitor.

== Anaphylaxis ==
Zomepirac does not cause anaphylaxis directly, but it is metabolized by UDP-glucuronosyltransferase (UGT) to a reactive glucuronide which binds irreversibly to plasma albumin.

== Synthesis ==
Zomepirac can be synthesized from diethyl 1,3-acetonedicarboxylate, chloroacetone, and aqueous methylamine (MeNH_{2}) via modification of the Hantzsch pyrrole synthesis to give intermediate 1. Saponification, monoesterification, and thermal decarboxylation gives ester 2. This is acylated with N,N-dimethyl-p-chlorobenzamide, and finally saponification gives zomepirac (3).

Zomepirac synthesis:

== See also ==
- Etoricoxib
- Ketorolac
