= Proquazone =

Nonsteroidal anti-inflammatory drug

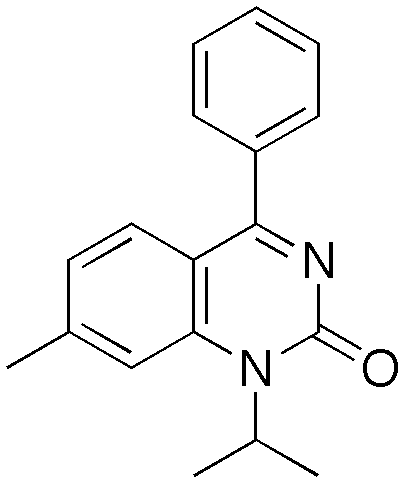

Clinical data
- ATC code: M01AX13 (WHO)

Identifiers
- IUPAC name: 1-isopropyl-7-methyl-4-phenylquinazolin-2(1H)-one
- CAS Number: 22760-18-5
- PubChem CID: 31508
- ChemSpider: 29222
- UNII: 42VPJ2980S
- ChEMBL: ChEMBL268501
- CompTox Dashboard (EPA): DTXSID4021210
- ECHA InfoCard: 100.041.079

Chemical and physical data
- Formula: C_{18}H_{18}N_{2}O
- Molar mass: 278.355 g·mol^{−1}
- 3D model (JSmol): Interactive image
- SMILES: CC1=CC2=C(C=C1)C(=NC(=O)N2C(C)C)C3=CC=CC=C3
- InChI: InChI=1S/C18H18N2O/c1-12(2)20-16-11-13(3)9-10-15(16)17(19-18(20)21)14-7-5-4-6-8-14/h4-12H,1-3H3; Key:JTIGKVIOEQASGT-UHFFFAOYSA-N

Proquazone is a nonsteroidal anti-inflammatory drug, known as an NSAID.

== Uses ==
Proquazone is used to treat rheumatoid arthritis, osteoarthritis and ankylosing spondylitis. It has been trialed for use as pain relief for tension headaches.

The recommended adult dose is around 450mg.

=== Side Effects ===
Often, use of Proquazone is associated with diarrhea (up to 30% of the time).
