= Cimicoxib =

NSAID analgesic veterinary medication

Names
- Preferred IUPAC name 4-[4-Chloro-5-(3-fluoro-4-methoxyphenyl)-1H-imidazol-1-yl]benzene-1-sulfonamide

Identifiers
| CAS Number | 265114-23-6 |
| 3D model (JSmol) | Interactive image |
| ChEBI | CHEBI:76127 |
| ChEMBL | ChEMBL435381 |
| ChemSpider | 184745 |
| ECHA InfoCard | 100.170.774 |
| PubChem CID | 213053 |
| UNII | W7FHJ107MC |
| CompTox Dashboard (EPA) | DTXSID30181093 |
- InChI: InChI=1S/C16H13ClFN3O3S/c1-24-14-7-2-10(8-13(14)18)15-16(17)20-9-21(15)11-3-5-12(6-4-11)25(19,22)23/h2-9H,1H3,(H2,19,22,23) Key: KYXDNECMRLFQMZ-UHFFFAOYSA-N; InChI=1/C16H13ClFN3O3S/c1-24-14-7-2-10(8-13(14)18)15-16(17)20-9-21(15)11-3-5-12(6-4-11)25(19,22)23/h2-9H,1H3,(H2,19,22,23) Key: KYXDNECMRLFQMZ-UHFFFAOYAQ
- SMILES: O=S(=O)(c3ccc(n1c(c(Cl)nc1)c2ccc(OC)c(F)c2)cc3)N

Properties
| Chemical formula | C_{16}H_{13}ClFN_{3}O_{3}S |
| Molar mass | 381.81 g·mol^{−1} |

Pharmacology
| ATCvet code | QM01AH93 (WHO) |
- Except where otherwise noted, data are given for materials in their standard state (at 25 °C [77 °F], 100 kPa). Infobox references

Cimicoxib (UR-8880 trade name Cimalgex) is a nonsteroidal anti-inflammatory drug (NSAID) used in veterinary medicine to treat dogs for pain and inflammation associated with osteoarthritis and for the management of pain and inflammation associated with surgery. It acts as a COX-2 inhibitor.

== Synthesis ==
The chemical synthesis of Cimicoxib was reported:

Cimicoxib synthesis

The reaction of N-acetylsulfanilyl chloride [121-60-8] (1) (available from chlorosulfonation of acetanilide) with tert-butylamine, gives N-(4-tert-butylsulfamoyl-phenyl)-acetamide [294885-56-6] (2). The acetyl group on nitrogen is then removed by heating with strong base to give N-tert-butyl 4-aminophenylsulfonamide [209917-48-6] (3). Condensation with 3-fluoro-4-anisaldehyde [351-54-2] (4) gives the anil, i.e. PC11132250 (5), which incorporates the two adjacent aromatic rings characteristic of COX-2 inhibitors. Reaction of the imine with TosMIC [36635-61-7] in the presence of potassium carbonate leads to what may be viewed as 2 + 3 cycloaddition of the nitrogen analogue of a ketene to form the imidazole ring, PC11784436 (6). This ring is then halogenated with N-chlorosuccinimide (NCS) giving PC10274815 (7). Acid hydrolysis of the protecting group gives the free sulfonamide and thus cimicoxib (8).
