= Oxyphenbutazone =

Chemical compound

Clinical data
- Trade names: Tandearil, Tanderil
- AHFS/Drugs.com: International Drug Names
- ATC code: M01AA03 (WHO) M02AA04 (WHO) S01BC02 (WHO)

Legal status
- Legal status: AU: Withdrawn; UK: Withdrawn; US: Withdrawn

Identifiers
- IUPAC name: (RS)-4-butyl-1-(4-hydroxyphenyl)-2-phenylpyrazolidine-3,5-dione
- CAS Number: 129-20-4
- PubChem CID: 104811
- DrugBank: DB03585
- ChemSpider: 94610
- UNII: A7D84513GV
- KEGG: D08324
- ChEBI: CHEBI:76258
- ChEMBL: ChEMBL1228
- CompTox Dashboard (EPA): DTXSID1045291
- ECHA InfoCard: 100.004.489

Chemical and physical data
- Formula: C_{19}H_{20}N_{2}O_{3}
- Molar mass: 324.380 g·mol^{−1}
- 3D model (JSmol): Interactive image
- Chirality: Racemic mixture
- SMILES: O=C2N(c1ccc(O)cc1)N(C(=O)C2CCCC)c3ccccc3.O
- InChI: InChI=1S/C19H20N2O3.H2O/c1-2-3-9-17-18(23)20(14-7-5-4-6-8-14)21(19(17)24)15-10-12-16(22)13-11-15;/h4-8,10-13,17,22H,2-3,9H2,1H3;1H2; Key:CNDQSXOVEQXJOE-UHFFFAOYSA-N

Oxyphenbutazone is a nonsteroidal anti-inflammatory drug (NSAID). It is a metabolite of phenylbutazone.

It was withdrawn from markets worldwide in the mid-1980s due to bone marrow suppression and the risk of Stevens–Johnson syndrome.

In Scrabble, playing “Oxyphenbutazone” vertically, is one of the moves involved in the highest possible point-awarding play.
