= Oxycinchophen =

Chemical compound

Clinical data
- ATC code: M01CA03 (WHO)

Identifiers
- IUPAC name: 3-Hydroxy-2-phenyl-4-quinolinecarboxylic acid
- CAS Number: 485-89-2
- PubChem CID: 10239
- ChemSpider: 9822
- UNII: UK6392GD5W
- KEGG: D07271
- CompTox Dashboard (EPA): DTXSID0057750
- ECHA InfoCard: 100.006.932

Chemical and physical data
- Formula: C_{16}H_{11}NO_{3}
- Molar mass: 265.268 g·mol^{−1}
- 3D model (JSmol): Interactive image
- SMILES: O=C(O)c1c3ccccc3nc(c1O)c2ccccc2
- InChI: InChI=1S/C16H11NO3/c18-15-13(16(19)20)11-8-4-5-9-12(11)17-14(15)10-6-2-1-3-7-10/h1-9,18H,(H,19,20); Key:XAPRFLSJBSXESP-UHFFFAOYSA-N

Oxycinchophen is an antirheumatic agent.
