= Oxaceprol =

Chemical compound

Clinical data
- Other names: (2S,4R)-1-acetyl-4-hydroxypyrrolidine-2-carboxylic acid
- AHFS/Drugs.com: International Drug Names
- ATC code: D11AX09 (WHO) M01AX24 (WHO)

Identifiers
- IUPAC name: (4R)-1-acetyl-4-hydroxy-L-proline
- CAS Number: 33996-33-7
- PubChem CID: 65784
- ChemSpider: 59203
- UNII: Q0XV76B96L
- KEGG: D07215
- ChEBI: CHEBI:233149
- ChEMBL: ChEMBL1407356
- CompTox Dashboard (EPA): DTXSID2046410
- ECHA InfoCard: 100.047.058

Chemical and physical data
- Formula: C_{7}H_{11}NO_{4}
- Molar mass: 173.168 g·mol^{−1}
- 3D model (JSmol): Interactive image
- SMILES: CC(=O)N1C[C@@H](C[C@H]1C(=O)O)O
- InChI: InChI=1S/C7H11NO4/c1-4(9)8-3-5(10)2-6(8)7(11)12/h5-6,10H,2-3H2,1H3,(H,11,12)/t5-,6+/m1/s1; Key:BAPRUDZDYCKSOQ-RITPCOANSA-N

Oxaceprol is an anti-inflammatory drug used in the treatment of osteoarthritis. It is derived from L-proline, a DNA-encoded amino acid. The active effect of Oxaceprol is to inhibit the adhesion and migration of white blood cells.
