= Azapropazone =

Nonsteroidal anti-inflammatory drug (NSAID)

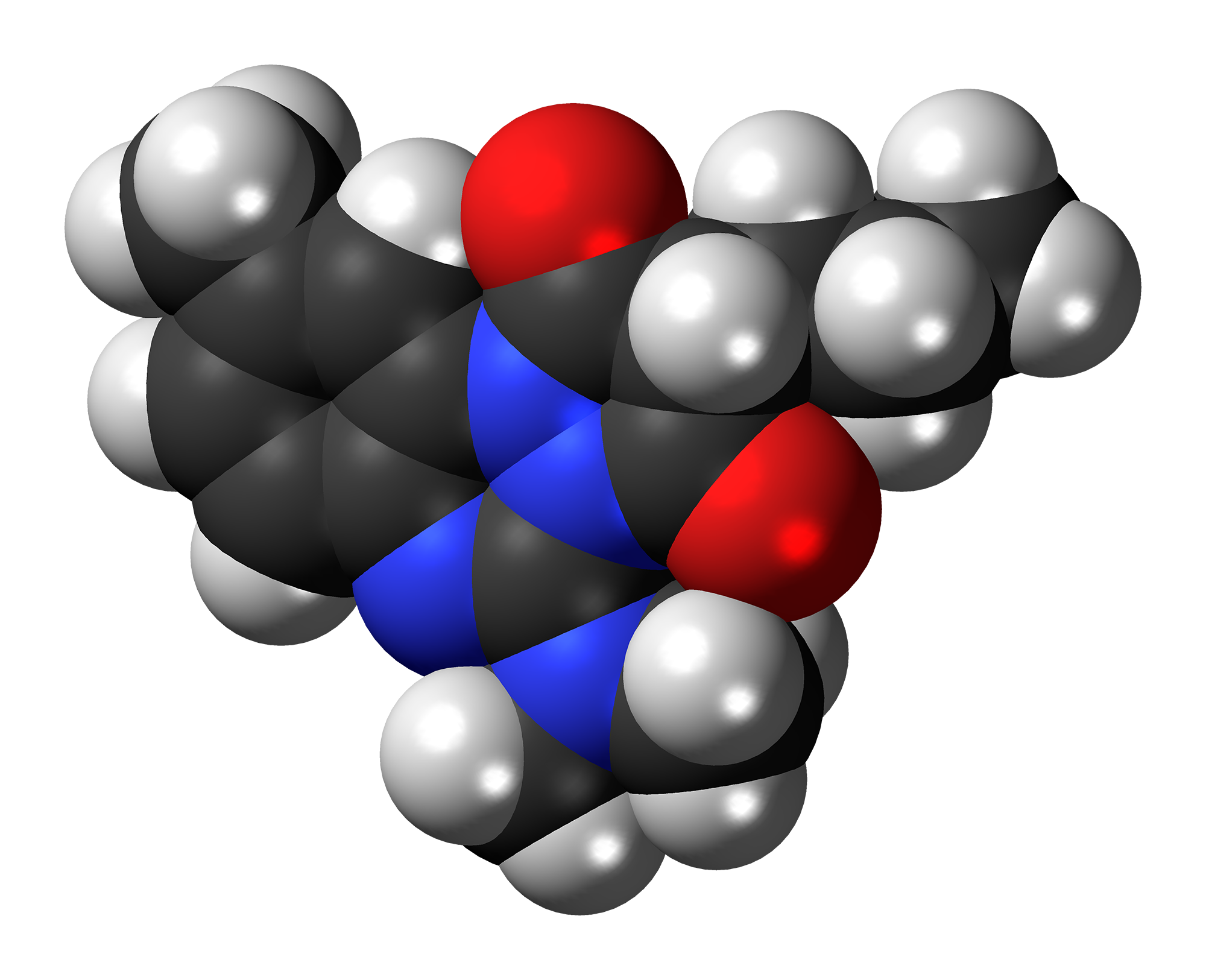

Clinical data
- Trade names: Rheumox
- AHFS/Drugs.com: International Drug Names
- ATC code: M01AX04 (WHO)

Legal status
- Legal status: UK: POM (Prescription only)

Pharmacokinetic data
- Elimination half-life: 20 hours

Identifiers
- IUPAC name: (RS)-5-(Dimethylamino)-9-methyl-2-propyl-1H-pyrazolo[1,2-a][1,2,4]benzotriazine-1,3(2H)-dione
- CAS Number: 13539-59-8
- PubChem CID: 26098
- ChemSpider: 24310
- UNII: K2VOT966ZI
- KEGG: D02966
- ChEBI: CHEBI:38010
- ChEMBL: ChEMBL1231131
- CompTox Dashboard (EPA): DTXSID6045408
- ECHA InfoCard: 100.033.543

Chemical and physical data
- Formula: C_{16}H_{20}N_{4}O_{2}
- Molar mass: 300.362 g·mol^{−1}
- 3D model (JSmol): Interactive image
- Chirality: Racemic mixture
- SMILES: O=C3N/1N(c2c(\N=C\1N(C)C)ccc(c2)C)C(=O)C3CCC
- InChI: InChI=1S/C16H20N4O2/c1-5-6-11-14(21)19-13-9-10(2)7-8-12(13)17-16(18(3)4)20(19)15(11)22/h7-9,11H,5-6H2,1-4H3; Key:MPHPHYZQRGLTBO-UHFFFAOYSA-N

Azapropazone is a nonsteroidal anti-inflammatory drug (NSAID). It is manufactured by Goldshield under the tradename Rheumox.

It was available in the UK as a prescription-only drug, with restrictions due to certain contra-indications and side-effects. Azopropazone has now been discontinued in the British National Formulary.

Azapropazone has a half-life of approximately 20 hours in humans and is not extensively metabolized.
