= Carprofen =

Non-steroidal anti-inflammatory drug

- Carprofen molecule

Clinical data
- Trade names: Rimadyl, others
- AHFS/Drugs.com: FDA Professional Drug Information
- License data: US DailyMed: Carprofen
- Routes of administration: By mouth, injection
- ATCvet code: QM01AE91 (WHO)

Legal status
- Legal status: US: ℞-only; EU: Rx-only

Pharmacokinetic data
- Protein binding: High (99%)
- Elimination half-life: Approximately 8 h (range 4.5–9.8 h) in dogs

Identifiers
- IUPAC name: (RS)-2-(6-Chloro-9H-carbazol-2-yl)propanoic acid
- CAS Number: 53716-49-7
- PubChem CID: 2581
- IUPHAR/BPS: 7141
- DrugBank: DB00821
- ChemSpider: 2483
- UNII: FFL0D546HO
- KEGG: D03410
- ChEBI: CHEBI:364453
- ChEMBL: ChEMBL1316
- CompTox Dashboard (EPA): DTXSID1045871
- ECHA InfoCard: 100.053.357

Chemical and physical data
- Formula: C_{15}H_{12}ClNO_{2}
- Molar mass: 273.72 g·mol^{−1}
- 3D model (JSmol): Interactive image
- Chirality: Racemic mixture
- SMILES: CC(C1=CC=C2C(NC3=CC=C(C=C32)Cl)=C1)C(O)=O
- InChI: InChI=1S/C15H12ClNO2/c1-8(15(18)19)9-2-4-11-12-7-10(16)3-5-13(12)17-14(11)6-9/h2-8,17H,1H3,(H,18,19); Key:PUXBGTOOZJQSKH-UHFFFAOYSA-N

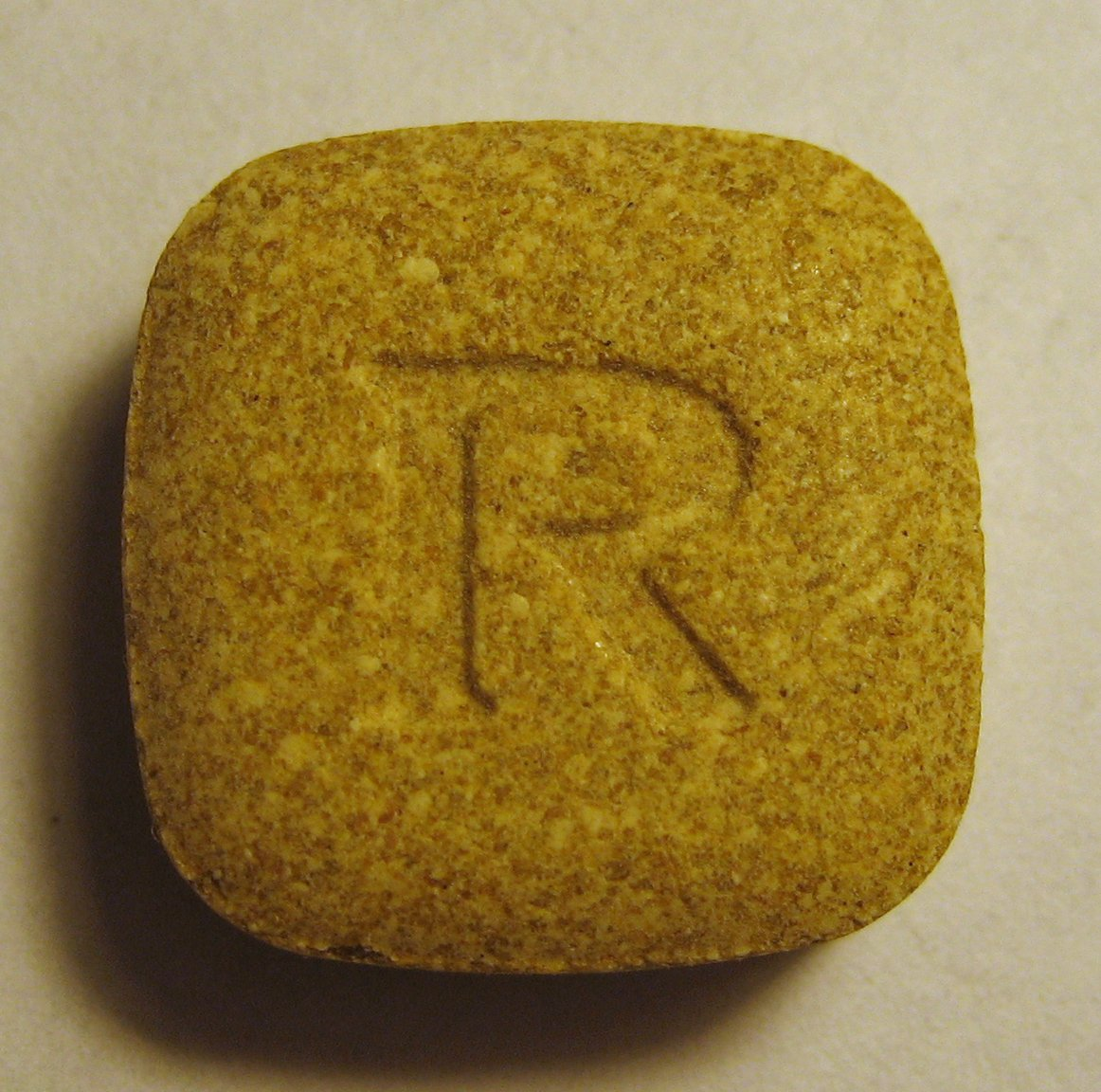
A 100 mg Rimadyl tablet approximately 19 mm (0.75 in) wide by 8.6 mm (0.34 in) thick, as sold in the USA.

Carprofen is a nonsteroidal anti-inflammatory drug (NSAID) of the carbazole and propionic acid class that was previously for use in humans and animals but is now only available to veterinarians for prescribing as a supportive treatment for various conditions in animals. Carprofen reduces inflammation by inhibition of COX-1 and COX-2; its specificity for COX-2 varies from species to species. Marketed under many brand names worldwide, carprofen is used as a treatment for inflammation and pain, including joint pain and postoperative pain.

== Human use ==
Carprofen was used in humans for almost ten years, starting in 1988, for the same conditions as in dogs; namely, joint pain and inflammation. Side effects tended to be mild, usually consisting of nausea or gastrointestinal pain and diarrhoea. It was available by prescription in 150 mg to 600 mg doses. Dosages over 250 mg were reserved for pain caused by severe trauma, such as postoperative inflammation; 150 mg doses were commonly used to relieve arthritis pain, while 200 mg doses were commonly prescribed for severe arthritis or inflammatory pain. The drug was taken orally.

Pfizer voluntarily removed the medication from the market for human use on commercial grounds.

== Veterinary medicine ==
=== Canine use ===
Carprofen is the most commonly used NSAID in dogs. It aids in the relief of inflammation, pain, and fever. Carprofen can be administered in pill, chewable tablet, or injection form.

Carprofen can be used for long-term pain management of conditions such as osteoarthritis, which is common in canine patients, and after injury or surgical procedures for relief of acute pain and inflammation.

==== Adverse effects ====
Most dogs respond well to carprofen use, but like all NSAIDs, it can cause gastrointestinal, liver, and kidney problems.

In 1999, the Food and Drug Administration (FDA) received more than six thousand anecdotal reports of sudden animal death after usage of Pfizer's Rimadyl brand of carprofen. In response, the FDA requested that Pfizer advise consumers in their advertising that death is a possible side effect; Pfizer refused and pulled their advertising, later including death as a possible side effect on the prescribing information.

Adverse effects can include:

- Loss of appetite
- Vomiting
- Diarrhea
- Increase in thirst
- Increase in urination
- Fatigue and/or lethargy (drowsiness)
- Loss of coordination
- Seizures
- Liver dysfunction: jaundice (yellowing of eyes)
- Blood or dark tarry material in urine or stools
- Lethargy
- Staggering, stumbling, weakness or partial paralysis, full paralysis
- Change in skin (redness, scabs, or scratching)
- Change in behavior (such as decreased or increased activity level, seizure or aggression)
- In rare situations, death has been associated with some of the adverse reactions listed above.

Effects of overdose include gastritis and ulcer formation.

In healthy dogs given carprofen, no perioperative adverse effects on the cardiovascular system have been reported at recommended dosages. Perioperative administration of carprofen to cats affected neither postoperative respiratory rate nor heart rate.

Laboratory studies and clinical trials have been conducted to assess the safety of carprofen. These clinical studies involved nearly 300 dogs of various breeds, which were treated with carprofen at the recommended dosage for two weeks. The findings indicated that the drug was well tolerated, and the treated dogs did not experience a higher rate of adverse reactions compared to the control group.

A number of factors may have contributed to the high incidence of adverse reports received for carprofen by the FDA's Center for Veterinary Medicine in the late 1990s. These include:

- The type of drug.
- Wide use.
- Duration of use: Long-term use can result in a higher risk of adverse reactions. It is recommended that blood tests for liver and kidney function are performed both prior to starting and regularly while on NSAIDs to monitor the patient’s tolerance.
- Senior dog use: Older dogs—especially those aged 10 and older—are generally more prone to side effects caused by carprofen.

=== Equine use ===
Carprofen may be administered intravenously to horses. A single dose has been shown to reduce prostaglandin E2 production and inflammatory exudate for up to 15 hours, albeit with an inferior effect on eicosanoid production relative to phenylbutazone and flunixin. Leukotriene B4 release is inhibited, as well. Carprofen can be given orally; intramuscular use may produce muscle damage.

=== Other animal use ===
Carprofen is used as an analgesic for mouse surgical procedures. Carprofen may also be used in adult fish.

=== Brands and dosage forms for veterinary use ===
It is marketed under many brand names including: Acticarp, Artriofin, Austiofen, Bomazeal, Canidryl, Carporal, Carprieve, Carprocow, Carprodolor, Carprodyl, Carprofelican, Carprofen, Carprofène, Carprofeno, Carprofenum, Carprogesic, Carprosol, Carprotab, Carprox, Comforion, Dolagis, Dolocarp, Dolox, Eurofen, Kelaprofen, Librevia, Norocarp, Norodyl, Novocox, Ostifen, Prolet, Quellin, Reproval, Rimadyl, Rimifin, Rofeniflex, Rovera, Rycarfa, Scanodyl, Tergive, Vetprofen, and Xelcor.
