= Oxifentorex =

Chemical compound

Clinical data
- ATC code: None

Identifiers
- IUPAC name: Benzyl(methyl)(1-phenyl-2-propanyl)amine oxide
- CAS Number: 4075-88-1
- PubChem CID: 176171
- ChemSpider: 153467
- UNII: 55W3209M28
- CompTox Dashboard (EPA): DTXSID60863315

Chemical and physical data
- Formula: C_{17}H_{21}NO
- Molar mass: 255.361 g·mol^{−1}
- 3D model (JSmol): Interactive image
- SMILES: CC(Cc1ccccc1)[N+](C)(Cc2ccccc2)[O-]
- InChI: InChI=1S/C17H21NO/c1-15(13-16-9-5-3-6-10-16)18(2,19)14-17-11-7-4-8-12-17/h3-12,15H,13-14H2,1-2H3; Key:LXPCOISGJFXEJE-UHFFFAOYSA-N

Oxifentorex (INN) is an amphetamine described as an anorectic which does not appear to have ever been marketed.
