= Oxametacin =

Chemical compound

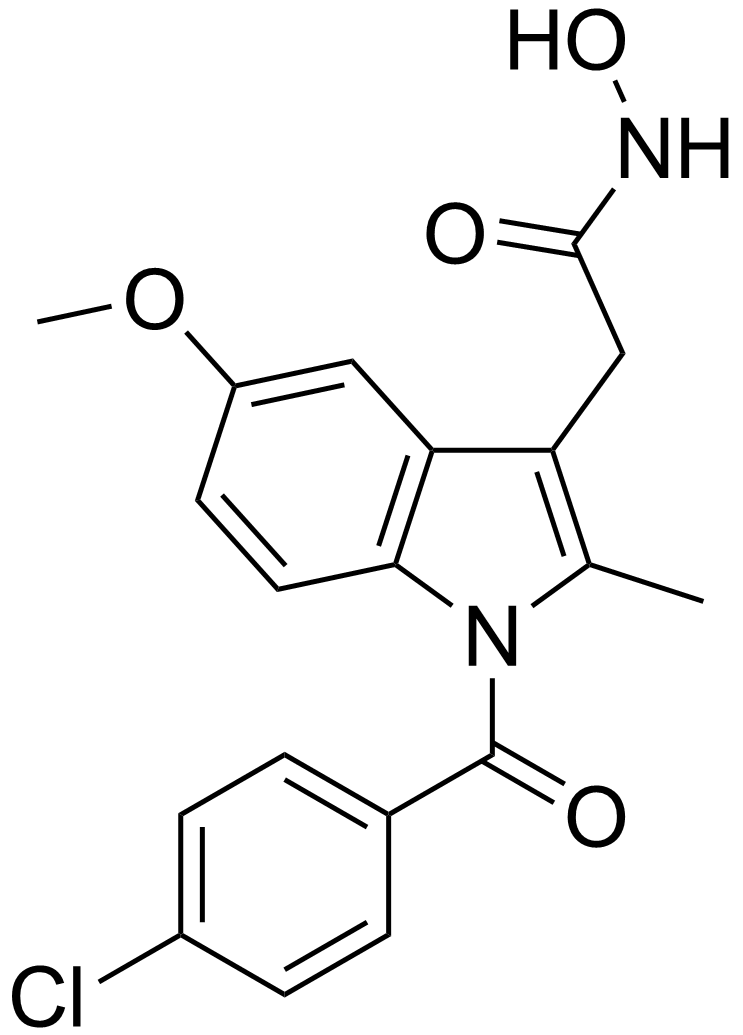

Clinical data
- ATC code: M01AB13 (WHO)

Identifiers
- IUPAC name: 2-[1-(4-chlorobenzoyl)-5-methoxy-2-methyl-1H-indol-3-yl]-N-hydroxyacetamide
- CAS Number: 27035-30-9
- PubChem CID: 33675
- ChemSpider: 31057
- UNII: 8G02RSW5CM
- KEGG: D07266
- ChEBI: CHEBI:76255
- ChEMBL: ChEMBL295829
- CompTox Dashboard (EPA): DTXSID70181517
- ECHA InfoCard: 100.043.785

Chemical and physical data
- Formula: C_{19}H_{17}ClN_{2}O_{4}
- Molar mass: 372.81 g·mol^{−1}
- 3D model (JSmol): Interactive image
- SMILES: CC1=C(C2=C(N1C(=O)C3=CC=C(C=C3)Cl)C=CC(=C2)OC)CC(=O)NO
- InChI: InChI=1S/C19H17ClN2O4/c1-11-15(10-18(23)21-25)16-9-14(26-2)7-8-17(16)22(11)19(24)12-3-5-13(20)6-4-12/h3-9,25H,10H2,1-2H3,(H,21,23); Key:AJRNYCDWNITGHF-UHFFFAOYSA-N

Oxametacin (or oxamethacin) is a non-steroidal anti-inflammatory drug.

Hydrolysis of the amide group is one of the synthetic pathways to Deboxamet (ChemDrug).
