= List of drugs: Am =

This multi-page article lists pharmaceutical drugs alphabetically by name. Many drugs have more than one name and, therefore, the same drug may be listed more than once. Brand names and generic names are differentiated by capitalizing brand names.

See also the list of the top 100 bestselling branded drugs, ranked by sales.

Abbreviations are used in the list as follows:

- INN = International nonproprietary name
- BAN = British Approved Name
- USAN = United States Adopted Name
- Two-letter codes for countries

Lists of drugs
1–9 | A | B | C | D | E | F | G | H | I | J | K | L | M | N | O | P | Q | R | S | T | U | V | W | X | Y | Z

Aa–Ab | Ac | Ad–Ak | Al | Am | An–Ap | Aq–Ar | As–Az

== ama-amb ==
- amadinone (INN)
- amafolone (INN)
- amanozine (INN)
- amantadine (INN)
- amantanium bromide (INN)
- amantocillin (INN)
- Amaphen
- Amaryl (Sanofi-Aventis), also known as glimepiride
- Amatine
- amatuximab (USAN)
- ambamustine (INN)
- ambasilide (INN)
- ambazone (INN)
- ambenonium chloride (INN)
- ambenoxan (INN)
- Ambenyl
- Ambelvist
- Ambi 10
- ambicromil (INN)
- Ambien (Sanofi-Aventis), also known as zolpidem
- Ambisome
- Ambodryl
- ambomycin (INN)
- ambroxol (INN)
- ambruticin (INN)
- ambucaine (INN)
- ambucetamide (INN)
- ambuside (INN)

== amc-ame ==
- Amcill
- amcinafal (INN)
- amcinafide (INN)
- amcinonide (INN)
- amdinocillin pivoxil (USAN)
- amdoxovir (USAN)
- amebucort (INN)
- amedalin (INN)
- amediplase (INN)
- Ameile
- amelometasone (INN)
- ameltolide (INN)
- Amen
- amenamevir (INN)
- Amerge (GlaxoSmithKline)
- Amerscan MDP Kit
- amesergide (INN)
- ametantrone (INN)
- Ametop
- Amevive
- amezepine (INN)
- amezinium metilsulfate (INN)

== amf ==
- amfebutamone
- amfecloral (INN)
- amfenac (INN)
- amfepentorex (INN)
- amfepramone (INN)
- amfetamine (INN)
- amfetaminil (INN)
- amflutizole (INN)
- amfomycin (INN)
- amfonelic acid (INN)

== ami ==
=== amib-amil ===
- amibegron (USAN, INN)
- Amibid LA
- Amicar
- amicarbalide (INN)
- amicibone (INN)
- amicycline (INN)
- amidantel (INN)
- amidapsone (INN)
- Amidate
- amidefrine mesilate (INN)
- amifampridine INN
- amiflamine (INN)
- amifloverine (INN)
- amifloxacin (INN)
- amifostine (INN)
- Amigesic
- amiglumide (INN)
- amikacin (INN)
- amikhelline (INN)
- Amikin
- amilomotide (INN)
- amiloride (INN)

=== amin-amio ===
- Amin-Aid
- amindocate (INN)
- amineptine (INN)
- Aminess
- aminitrozole (INN)
- Amino-Cerv
- Amino-Opti-E
- aminoacridine (INN)
- aminocaproic acid (INN)
- aminoethyl nitrate (INN)
- aminoglutethimide (INN)
- aminometradine (INN)
- aminophenazone cyclamate (INN)
- aminophenazone (INN)
- Aminophyllin
- aminophylline (INN)
- aminopromazine (INN)
- aminopterin sodium (INN)
- aminoquinol (INN)
- aminoquinuride (INN)
- aminorex (INN)
- Aminosol
- aminothiazole (INN)
- Aminoxin
- aminoxytriphene (INN)
- amiodarone (INN)

=== amip-amj ===
- Amipaque
- amiperone (INN)
- amiphenazole (INN)
- amipizone (INN)
- amiprilose (INN)
- amiquinsin (INN)
- amisometradine (INN)
- amisulpride (INN)
- amiterol (INN)
- Amitid
- amitivir (INN)
- Amitone
- amitraz (INN)
- Amitril
- amitriptyline (INN)
- amitriptylinoxide (INN)
- amivantamab (INN)
- amivantamab-vmjw
- amixetrine (INN)
- Amjevita

== aml-amo ==
- AmLactin
- amlexanox (INN)
- amlintide (INN)
- amlodipine (INN)
- Amnesteem
- Amnestrogen
- AMO Vitrax
- amobarbital (INN)
- amocarzine (INN)
- amodiaquine (INN)
- amogastrin (INN)
- Amohexal (Hexal Australia) [Au], also known as amoxicillin.
- amolanone (INN)
- amolimogene bepiplasmid (USAN)
- amonafide (INN)
- Amonidrin Tablet
- amoproxan (INN)
- amopyroquine (INN)
- amorolfine (INN)
- Amoscanate (INN)
- Amosene
- amotosalen hydrochloride (USAN)
- amosulalol (INN)
- amoxapine (INN)
- amoxecaine (INN)
- amoxicillin (INN)
- amoxicillin/clavulanic acid
- Amoxicot
- Amoxil
- amoxydramine camsilate (INN)

== amp-amz ==
- amperozide (INN)
- Amphadase
- amphenidone (INN)
- amphetamine
- Amphicol
- Amphocin
- Amphojel
- amphotalide (INN)
- Amphotec
- amphotericin B (INN)
- ampicillin (INN)
- ampiroxicam (INN)
- amprenavir
- amprolium (INN)
- AMPT
- ampyrimine (INN)
- ampyzine (INN)
- amquinate (INN)
- Amrinone
- amrinone (INN)
- amrubicin (INN)
- amsacrine (INN)
- amsilarotene (USAN)
- Amsparity
- Amtagvi
- amtolmetin guacil (INN)
- amustaline dihydrochloride (USAN)
- amuvatinib (USAN, INN)
- Amvaz
- Amvisc
- Amvuttra
- amylmetacresol (INN)
- Amytal
- Amzyos
