= Analgesic =

Drugs used to achieve relief from pain

- Drug class
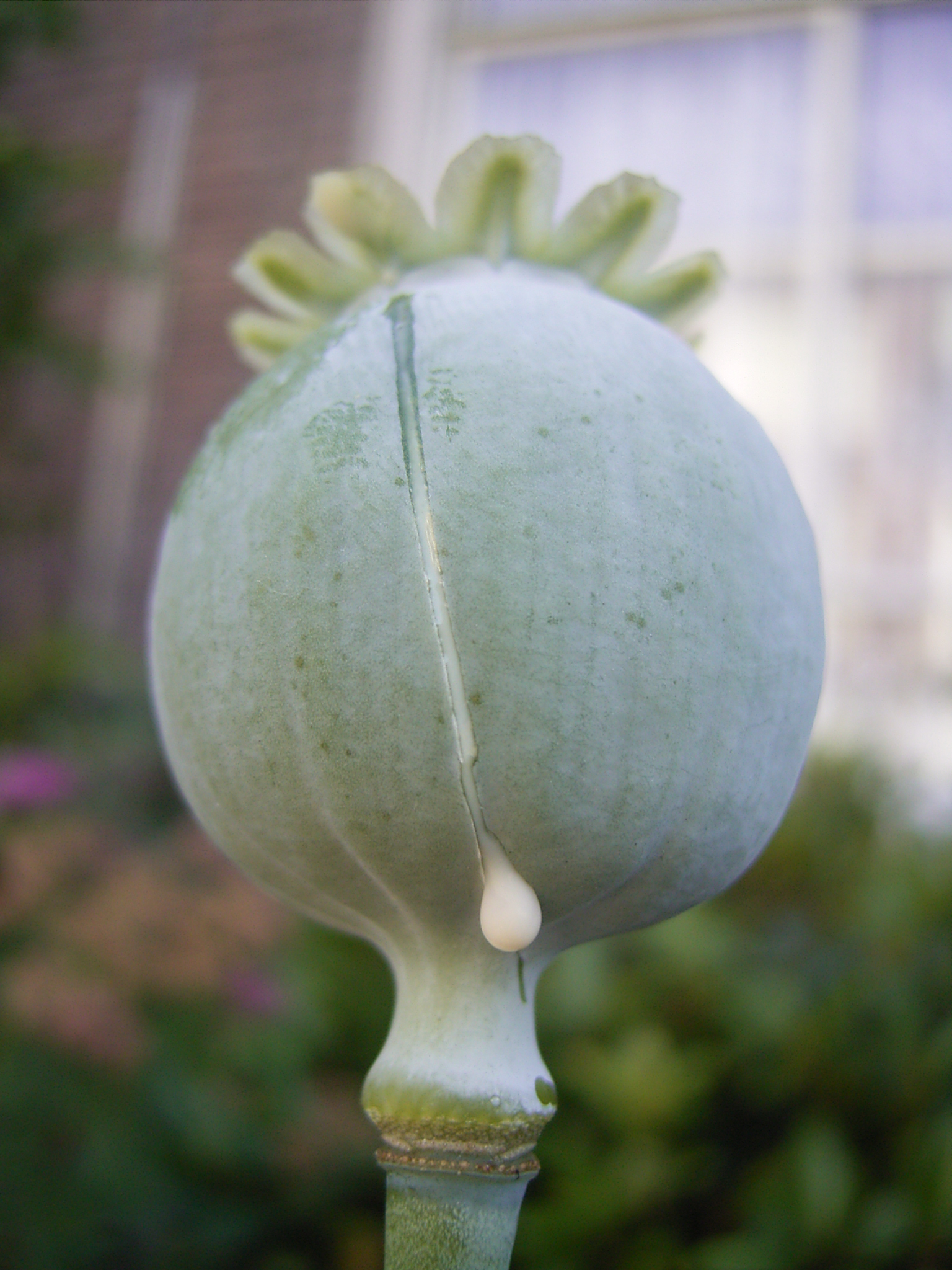
- Opium poppies provide ingredients for the class of analgesics called opiates.

Class identifiers
- Pronunciation: /ˌænælˈdʒiːzɪk/
- Synonyms: Antalgic; painkiller; pain reliever
- Use: Pain
- ATC code: N02A

Clinical data
- Drugs.com: Drug Classes
- Consumer Reports: Best Buy Drugs
- WebMD: MedicineNet

Legal status

An analgesic, also called an antalgic, painkiller, or pain reliever, is any member of the group of drugs used for pain management. Analgesics are conceptually distinct from anesthetics, which temporarily reduce, and in some instances eliminate, mobility, although analgesia and anesthesia are neurophysiologically overlapping and thus various drugs have both analgesic and anesthetic effects.

Analgesic choice is also determined by the type of pain: For neuropathic pain, recent research has suggested that classes of drugs that are not normally considered analgesics, such as tricyclic antidepressants and anticonvulsants may be considered as an alternative.

Various analgesics, such as many NSAIDs, are available over the counter in most countries, whereas various others are prescription drugs owing to the substantial risks and high chances of overdose, misuse, and addiction in the absence of medical supervision.

== Etymology ==
The word analgesic derives from Greek an- (ἀν-, "without"), álgos (ἄλγος, "pain"), and -ikos (-ικος, forming adjectives). Such drugs were usually known as "anodynes" before the 20th century.

== Classification ==
Analgesics are typically classified based on their mechanism of action.

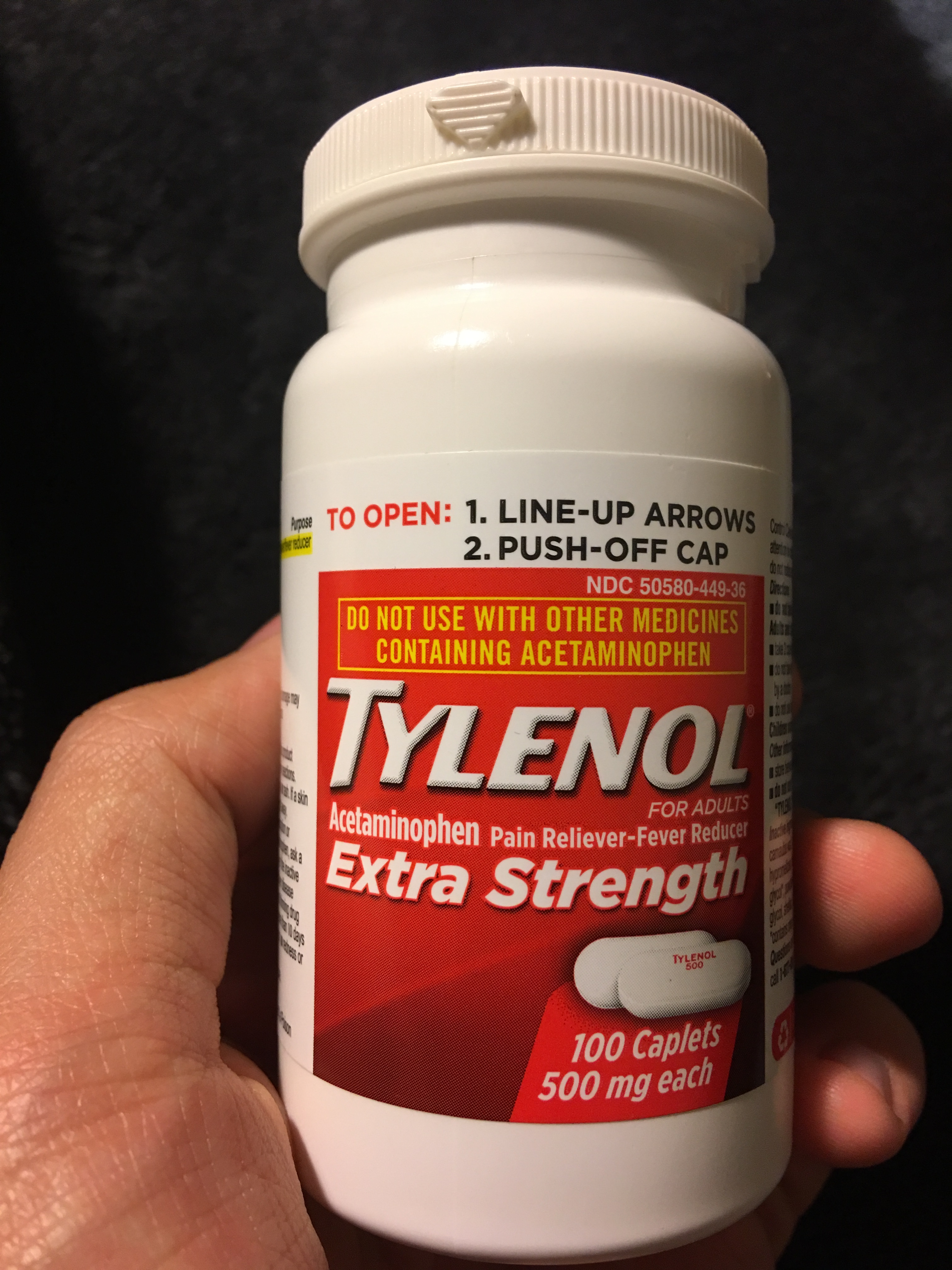
A bottle of acetaminophen

=== Paracetamol (acetaminophen) ===
Paracetamol, also known as acetaminophen, is a medication used to treat pain and fever. It is typically used for mild to moderate pain. In combination with opioid pain medication, paracetamol is now used for more severe pain such as cancer pain and after surgery. It is typically used either by mouth or rectally but is also available intravenously. Effects last between two and four hours. Paracetamol is classified as a mild analgesic, and is generally safe at recommended doses.

=== NSAIDs ===
Nonsteroidal anti-inflammatory drugs (NSAIDs) are a drug class that groups together drugs that decrease pain and lower fever, and, in higher doses, decrease inflammation. The most prominent members of this group of drugs—aspirin, ibuprofen, naproxen, and diclofenac—are all available over the counter in most countries.

==== COX-2 inhibitors ====
These drugs have been derived from NSAIDs. The cyclooxygenase enzyme inhibited by NSAIDs was discovered to have at least two different versions: COX-1 and COX-2. Research suggested most of the adverse effects of NSAIDs were caused by blocking the COX-1 (constitutive) enzyme, with the analgesic effects being mediated by the COX-2 (inducible) enzyme. Thus, the COX-2 inhibitors were developed to inhibit only the COX-2 enzyme (traditional NSAIDs block both versions in general). These drugs (e.g., rofecoxib, celecoxib, and etoricoxib) are equally effective analgesics when compared with NSAIDs, but cause less gastrointestinal hemorrhage in particular.

After widespread adoption of the COX-2 inhibitors, it was discovered that most of the drugs in this class increase the risk of cardiovascular events by 40% on average. This led to the withdrawal of rofecoxib and valdecoxib, and warnings on others. Etoricoxib seems relatively safe, with the risk of thrombotic events similar to that of non-coxib NSAID diclofenac.

=== Opioids ===
Morphine, the archetypal opioid, and other opioids (e.g., codeine, oxycodone, hydrocodone, dihydromorphine, pethidine) all exert a similar influence on the cerebral opioid receptor system. Buprenorphine is a partial agonist of the μ-opioid receptor, and tramadol is a serotonin–norepinephrine reuptake inhibitor (SNRI) with weak μ-opioid receptor agonist properties. Tramadol is structurally closer to venlafaxine than to codeine and delivers analgesia by not only delivering "opioid-like" effects (through mild agonism of the μ-opioid receptor) but also by acting as a weak but fast-acting serotonin releasing agent and norepinephrine reuptake inhibitor. Tapentadol, with some structural similarities to tramadol, presents what is believed to be a novel drug working through two (and possibly three) different modes of action in the fashion of both a traditional opioid and as an SNRI. The effects of serotonin and norepinephrine on pain, while not completely understood, have had causal links established and drugs in the SNRI class are commonly used in conjunction with opioids (especially tapentadol and tramadol) with greater success in pain relief.

Dosing of all opioids may be limited by opioid toxicity (e.g., confusion, respiratory depression, myoclonic jerks, and pinpoint pupils), seizures (particularly from tramadol), but opioid-tolerant individuals usually have higher dose ceilings than patients without tolerance. Opioids, while very effective analgesics, may have some unpleasant side-effects. Patients starting morphine may experience nausea and vomiting (generally relieved by a short course of antiemetics such as phenergan). Pruritus (itching) may require switching to a different opioid. Constipation occurs in almost all patients on opioids, and laxatives (lactulose, macrogol-containing or co-danthramer) are typically co-prescribed.

Opioid tolerance should not be confused with opioid-induced hyperalgesia. The symptoms of these two conditions can appear very similar but the mechanism of action is different. Opioid-induced hyperalgesia is when exposure to opioids increases the sensation of pain (hyperalgesia) and can even make non-painful stimuli painful (allodynia).

=== Alcohol ===
Alcohol has biological, mental, and social effects which influence the consequences of using alcohol for pain. Moderate use of alcohol can lessen certain types of pain in certain circumstances.

The majority of its analgesic effects come from antagonizing NMDA receptors, similarly to ketamine, thus decreasing the activity of the primary excitatory (signal boosting) neurotransmitter, glutamate. It also functions as an analgesic to a lesser degree by increasing the activity of the primary inhibitory (signal reducing) neurotransmitter, GABA.

Attempting to use alcohol to treat pain has also been observed to lead to negative outcomes including excessive drinking and alcohol use disorder.

=== Cannabis ===
Medical cannabis, or medical marijuana, refers to cannabis or its cannabinoids used to treat disease or improve symptoms. There is evidence suggesting that cannabis can be used to treat chronic pain and muscle spasms, with some trials indicating improved relief of neuropathic pain over opioids.

=== Combinations ===
Analgesics are frequently used in combination, such as the paracetamol and codeine preparations found in many non-prescription pain relievers. They can also be found in combination with vasoconstrictor drugs such as pseudoephedrine for sinus-related preparations, or with antihistamine drugs for people with allergies.

While the use of paracetamol, aspirin, ibuprofen, naproxen, and other NSAIDs concurrently with weak to mid-range opioids (up to about the hydrocodone level) has been said to show beneficial synergistic effects by combating pain at multiple sites of action, several combination analgesic products have been shown to have few efficacy benefits when compared to similar doses of their individual components. Moreover, these combination analgesics can often result in significant adverse events, including accidental overdoses, most often due to confusion that arises from the multiple (and often non-acting) components of these combinations.

=== Alternative medicine ===
There is some evidence that some treatments using alternative medicine can relieve some types of pain more effectively than placebo. The available research concludes that more research would be necessary to better understand the use of alternative medicine.

=== Other drugs ===
Nefopam—a monoamine reuptake inhibitor, and calcium and sodium channel modulator—is also approved for the treatment of moderate to severe pain in some countries.

Flupirtine is a centrally acting K^{+} channel opener with weak NMDA antagonist properties. It was used in Europe for moderate to strong pain, as well as its migraine-treating and muscle-relaxant properties. It has no significant anticholinergic properties, and is believed to be devoid of any activity on dopamine, serotonin, or histamine receptors. It is not addictive, and tolerance usually does not develop. However, tolerance may develop in some cases.

Ziconotide, a blocker of potent N-type voltage-gated calcium channels, is administered intrathecally for the relief of severe, usually cancer-related pain.

=== Adjuvants ===
Certain drugs that have been introduced for uses other than analgesics are also used in pain management. Both first-generation (such as amitriptyline) and newer antidepressants (such as duloxetine) are used alongside NSAIDs and opioids for pain involving nerve damage and similar problems. Other agents directly potentiate the effects of analgesics, such as using hydroxyzine, promethazine, carisoprodol, or tripelennamine to increase the pain-killing ability of a given dose of opioid analgesic.

Adjuvant analgesics, also called atypical analgesics, include orphenadrine, mexiletine, pregabalin, gabapentin, cyclobenzaprine, hyoscine (scopolamine), and other drugs possessing anticonvulsant, anticholinergic, and/or antispasmodic properties, as well as many other drugs with CNS actions. These drugs are used along with analgesics to modulate and/or modify the action of opioids when used against pain, especially of neuropathic origin.

Dextromethorphan has been noted to slow the development of and reverse tolerance to opioids, as well as to exert additional analgesia by acting upon NMDA receptors, as does ketamine. Some analgesics such as methadone and ketobemidone and perhaps piritramide have intrinsic NMDA action.

The anticonvulsant carbamazepine is used to treat neuropathic pain. Similarly, the gabapentinoids gabapentin and pregabalin are prescribed for neuropathic pain, and phenibut is available without prescription. Gabapentinoids work as α_{2}δ-subunit blockers of voltage-gated calcium channels, and tend to have other mechanisms of action as well. Gabapentinoids are all anticonvulsants, which are most commonly used for neuropathic pain, as their mechanism of action tends to inhibit pain sensation originating from the nervous system.

=== Other uses ===
Topical analgesia is generally recommended to avoid systemic side-effects. Painful joints, for example, may be treated with an ibuprofen- or diclofenac-containing gel (The labeling for topical diclofenac has been updated to warn about drug-induced hepatotoxicity.); capsaicin also is used topically. Lidocaine, an anesthetic, and steroids may be injected into joints for longer-term pain relief. Lidocaine is also used for painful mouth sores and to numb areas for dental work and minor medical procedures. In February 2007 the FDA notified consumers and healthcare professionals of the potential hazards of topical anesthetics entering the bloodstream when applied in large doses to the skin without medical supervision. These topical anesthetics contain anesthetic drugs such as lidocaine, tetracaine, benzocaine, and prilocaine in a cream, ointment, or gel.

== Uses ==
Topical nonsteroidal anti-inflammatory drugs provide pain relief in common conditions such as muscle sprains and overuse injuries. Since the side effects are also lesser, topical preparations could be preferred over oral medications in these conditions.

== List of analgesics ==
Comparison of different analgesics
| Generic name (INN) | Physicochemistry | Mechanism of action | Routes of administration | Pharmacokinetics | Indications | Major safety concerns |
|---|---|---|---|---|---|---|
Nonsteroidal anti-inflammatory drugs
Unselective agents
| Aceclofenac | Comes in betadex salt and free acid forms; practically insoluble in water, soluble in many organic solvents; degrades on contact with light; phenylacetic acid derivative. | As per diclofenac. | Oral (PO.) | Protein binding > 99%; half-life = 4 hours; metabolised to diclofenac (minor); excretion = urine (67%). | As per diclofenac. | As per diclofenac. |
| Acemetacin | Comes in free form; practically insoluble in water, soluble in certain organic solvents; degrades upon contact with light. Chemically related to indometacin | As per diclofenac. | PO. | Slightly metabolised to indometacin. | Rheumatoid arthritis, osteoarthritis and lower back pain. | As per diclofenac. |
| Amfenac | No available data. | As per diclofenac. | PO. | No data. | Pain and inflammation. | As diclofenac. |
| Aminophenazone | Related to phenylbutazone. | As per diclofenac. | PO. | Not available. | Musculoskeletal and joint disorders. | Agranulocytosis and cancer. |
| Ampiroxicam | Related to piroxicam. | As per diclofenac. | PO. | No data. | Rheumatoid arthritis and osteoarthritis. | Photosensitivity and other AEs typical of NSAIDs. |
| Amtolmetin guacil | Prodrug to tolmetin. | As per diclofenac. | PO. | No data. | As per diclofenac. | As per diclofenac. |
| Aspirin | Comes in free form, aluminium and lysine salt forms; fairly insoluble in water (1 in 300); highly soluble (1 in 5) in alcohol; degrades on contact with air. Salicylate. | Irreversibly inhibits COX-1 and COX-2; hence inhibiting prostaglandin synthesis. | PO, IM, IV, rectal | Bioavailability = 80–100%; protein binding = 25–95% (inversely dependent on plasma concentration); half-life = 2–3 hours, 15–30 hours (higher doses); excretion = 80–100%. | Blood thinning; mild-to-moderate pain; fever; rheumatic fever; migraine; rheumatoid arthritis; Kawasaki's disease | GI bleeds; ulcers; Reye syndrome; nephrotoxicity; blood dyscrasias (rarely); Stevens–Johnson syndrome (uncommon/rare) |
| Azapropazone | Comes in free form; fairly insoluble in water and chloroform, soluble in ethanol; phenylbutazone. | As per diclofenac. | PO, rectal. | No data available. | Rheumatoid arthritis; gout; ankylosing spondylitis. | As per diclofenac. |
| Bendazac | Comes in free acid and lysine salt forms. Chemically related to indometacin. | As per acetametacin. | Topical, ophthalmologic. | N/A | Skin conditions (such as contact dermatitis) and cataracts. | Hepatotoxicity reported. |
| Benorilate | Aspirin-paracetamol ester. Practically insoluble in water, sparingly soluble in ethanol and methanol, soluble in acetone and chloroform. | As per aspirin and paracetamol. | PO. | Unavailable. | Osteoarthritis; rheumatoid arthritis; soft-tissue rheumatism; mild-moderate pain and fever. | As per aspirin and paracetamol. |
| Benzydamine | Comes in free acid form; freely soluble in water. | As per diclofenac. | Topical, PO, rectal, spray and vaginal. | No data available. | Musculoskeletal disorders; soft-tissue disorders; sore throat. | As per diclofenac. |
| Bromfenac | Comes in free acid form; phenylacetic acid derivative. | Reversible COX-1/COX-2 inhibitor. | Ophthalmologic. | N/A | Postoperative pain and inflammation. | Corneal ulceration. |
| Bufexamac | Comes in free acid form; practically insoluble in water, soluble in a few organic solvents; degrades upon contact with light. | Reversible COX-1/COX-2 inhibition. | Topical. | No data. | Skin disorders. | Skin conditions, such as contact dermatitis. |
| Carbasalate | Comes in calcium salt form; fairly soluble in water. | Is metabolised to aspirin and urea. As per aspirin. | Oral. | No data. | Used for thromboembolic disorders. | As per diclofenac. |
| Clonixin | Comes in free acid and lysine salt forms. | Reversible COX-1/COX-2 inhibition. | PO, IM, IV, rectal. | No data. | Pain. | As per diclofenac. |
| Dexibuprofen | D-isomer of ibuprofen. Propionic acid derivative. | As per diclofenac. | PO. | Bioavailability = ?; protein binding = 99%; metabolism = hepatic via carboxylation and hydroxylation; half-life = 1.8–3.5 hours; excretion = Urine (90%). | Osteoarthritis; mild-moderate pain and menstrual pain. | As per diclofenac. |
| Diclofenac | Comes in sodium, potassium and diethylamine (topically used as a gel) salt forms; sparingly soluble in water but soluble in ethanol. Unstable in the presence of light and air. Indole acetic acid derivative. | Reversible COX-1/COX-2 inhibitor. | PO and topical. | Bioavailability = 50–60%; protein binding = 99–99.8%; hepatic metabolism; half-life = 1.2–2 hours; excretion = urine (50–70%), faeces (30–35%) | Rheumatoid arthritis; osteoarthritis; inflammatory pain (e.g. period pain); local pain/inflammation (as a gel); actinic keratoses; heavy menstrual bleeding | As per aspirin, except without Reye syndrome and with the following additions: myocardial infarctions, strokes and hypertension. More prone to causing these AEs compared to the other non-selective NSAIDs. |
| Diethylamine salicylate | Freely soluble in water; degrades upon contact with light and iron. | As per diclofenac. | Topical. | N/A. | Rheumatic and musculoskeletal pain. | As per bufexamac. |
| Diflunisal | Comes in free acid and arginine salt forms; practically insoluble in water, soluble in ethanol; degrades upon contact with light. | As per diclofenac. | PO, IM, IV. | Bioavailability = 80–100%; protein binding > 99%; volume of distribution = 0.11 L/kg; hepatic metabolism; half-life = 8–12 hours; excretion = urine (90%), faeces (<5%). | Pain; osteoarthritis; rheumatoid arthritis. | As per diclofenac. |
| Epirizole | Comes in free form. | As per diclofenac. | PO. | Not available. | Rheumatoid arthritis. | As per diclofenac. |
| Ethenzamide | Comes in free form; salicylate. | As per diclofenac. | PO. | Not available. | Musculoskeletal pain; fever. | As per diclofenac. |
| Etofenamate | Liquid; practically insoluble in water, miscible with ethyl acetate and methanol. | As per diclofenac. | Topical. | Not available. | Musculoskeletal, joint and soft-tissue disorders. | As per bufexamac. |
| Felbinac | Comes in free and diisopropanolamine salt forms; practically insoluble in water and ethanol, soluble in methanol. | As per diclofenac. | Topical. | N/A | Musculoskeletal pain and soft tissue injuries. | As per bufexamac. |
| Fenbufen | Comes as free acid; fairly insoluble in most solvents (including water); propionic acid derivative. | As per diclofenac. | PO. | Protein binding > 99%; half-life = 10–17 hours. | As per diclofenac. | As per diclofenac. |
| Fenoprofen | Comes in calcium salt; fairly insoluble in water and chloroform and fairly soluble in alcohol; sensitive to degradation by air. Propionic acid derivative. | As per diclofenac. | PO. | Bioavailability = ?; protein binding = 99%; hepatic metabolism; excretion = urine, faeces. | Pain; rheumatoid arthritis and osteoarthritis. | As per diclofenac. |
| Fentiazac | Comes in free form and calcium salt; acetic acid derivative. | As per diclofenac. | PO. | No data. | As per diclofenac. | As per diclofenac. |
| Fepradinol | Comes in free acid and hydrochloride salt forms. | As per diclofenac. | Topical. | N/A | Local inflammatory response. | As per bufexamac. |
| Feprazone | Comes in free acid and piperazine salt forms. Phenylbutazone. | As per diclofenac. | PO, Rectal, topical. | Not available. | As per diclofenac. | As per bufexamac (topical use) and diclofenac (PO/rectal). |
| Floctafenine | Comes in free acid form; anthranilic acid derivative. | As per diclofenac. | Oral. | Extensively metabolised by the liver; half-life = 8 hours; excretion = urinary and biliary. | Short-term relief from pain. | As per diclofenac. |
| Flufenamic acid | Comes in free acid form and aluminium salt form; anthranilic acid. | As per diclofenac. | Topical. | N/A | Soft tissue inflammation and pain. | As per bufexamac. |
| Flurbiprofen | Comes in sodium salt and free acid forms; fairly insoluble in water but soluble in ethanol; sensitive to degradation by air. Propionic acid derivative. | As per diclofenac. | PO, IM, IV, ophthalmologic. | Bioavailability = 96% (oral); protein binding > 99%; volume of distribution = 0.12 L/kg; excretion = urine (70%). | Ophthalmologic: Vernal keratoconjunctivitis; postoperative ocular swelling; herpetic stromal keratitis, excimer laser photorefractive keratectomy; ocular gingivitis. Systemic use: rheumatoid arthritis; osteoarthritis. | As per bromfenac (ophthalmologic) and diclofenac (PO/IM/IV). |
| Glucametacin | Indometacin derivative. | As per diclofenac. | PO. | Not available. | Musculoskeletal, joint, peri-articular and soft-tissue disorders. | As per diclofenac. |
| Ibuprofen | Comes in lysine salt, potassium salt and free acid forms; practically insoluble in water, but soluble in ethanol, acetone, methanol, dichloromethane and chloroform. Degrades in the presence of air. Propionic acid derivative. | As per diclofenac. | PO, IV, topical | Bioavailability = 80–100%; protein binding = 90–99%; hepatic metabolism, mostly via CYP2C9 and CYP2C19-mediated oxidation; excretion = Urine (50–60%), faeces. | Pain; fever; inflammatory illness; rheumatoid arthritis; osteoarthritis; heavy menstrual bleeding; patent ductus arteriosus. | As per diclofenac, except with lower risk of myocardial infarction, stroke and hypertension. |
| Imidazole salicylate | Comes in free form. Salicylate. | As per diclofenac. | PO, rectal, topical. | Not available. | Muscular and rheumatic pain. | As per bufexamac (topical use) and diclofenac (PO/rectal). |
| Indometacin | Comes in free acid and sodium salt forms; practically insoluble in water and most solvents; sensitive to degradation by light. Acetic acid derivative. | As per diclofenac. | PO, IV, rectal | Bioavailability = 100% (oral); protein binding = 90%; hepatic metabolism; excretion = urine (60%), faeces (33%). | Rheumatoid arthritis; osteoarthritis; gout; ankylosing spondylitis; period pain; patent ductus arteriosus. | As per diclofenac. |
| Isonixin | Comes in free form. | As per diclofenac. | PO, rectal and topical. | Not available. | Musculoskeletal and joint disorders. | As per bufexamac (topical use) and diclofenac (PO/rectal). |
| Kebuzone | Comes in free and sodium salt form; phenylbutazone derivative. | As per diclofenac. | IM, PO. | Not available. | As per diclofenac. | As per diclofenac. |
| Ketoprofen | Comes in free acid, lysine salt, sodium salt and hydrochloride salt forms; the dex-enantiomer comes in trometamol salt form. Practically insoluble in water; freely soluble in most other solvents. Propionic acid derivative. | As per diclofenac. | PO, rectal, topical, transdermal, intravenous, intramuscular. | Bioavailability > 92% (oral), 70–90% (rectal); protein binding > 99%; volume of distribution = 0.1–0.2 L/kg; hepatic metabolism; half-life = 1.5–2 hours (oral), 2.2 hours (rectal), 2 hours (intravenous). | Rheumatoid arthritis, osteoarthritis and superficial sporting injuries (topical use). | As per diclofenac. |
| Ketorolac | Comes in the trometamol salt form; highly soluble in water. Degrades in the presence of light. Acetic acid derivative. | As per diclofenac. | PO, IM, IV, intranasal, tromethamine and ophthalmologic. | Bioavailability of IM formulation = 100%; protein binding = 99%; hepatic metabolism mostly via glucoronic acid conjugation and p-hydroxylation; half-life = 5–6 hours; excretion = urine (91.4%), faeces (6.1%). | Mild-moderate postoperative pain; acute migraine; inflammation of the eye due to cataract surgery or allergic seasonal conjunctivitis; prevention of acute pseudophakic cystoid macular oedema. | As per diclofenac. |
| Lornoxicam | Hydrochloride salt form used; oxicam derivative. | As per diclofenac. | PO. | Protein binding = 99%; volume of distribution = 0.2 L/kg; half-life = 3–5 hours; excretion = faeces (51%), urine (42%). | Acute and chronic pain. | As per diclofenac. |
| Loxoprofen | Comes in sodium salt form. Propionic acid derivative. | As per diclofenac. | Topical. | N/A | Local inflammation and pain. | As per diclofenac. |
| Magnesium salicylate | Comes in free form; soluble in water and ethanol; salicylate. | As per diclofenac. | PO. | Not available. | As per diclofenac. | As per diclofenac. |
| Meclofenamic acid | Comes in free acid and sodium salt form, sodium salt is the form used in human medicine; practically insoluble in water (free acid) and freely soluble in water (sodium salt); sensitive to degradation by air and light. | As per diclofenac. | PO. | Protein binding > 99%; half-life = 2–4 hours; hepatically metabolised via oxidation, hydroxylation, dehalogenation and conjugation with glucuronic acid; excretion = urine, faeces (20–30%). | Osteoarthritis; rheumatoid arthritis; mild-moderate pain; dysmenorrhoea; menorrhagia. | As per diclofenac. |
| Mefenamic acid | Comes in free acid form; practically insoluble in water, fairly insoluble in organic solvents; degrades on contact with air and light. Anthranilic acid derivative. | As per diclofenac. | PO. | Protein binding extensive; hepatic metabolism, mostly via CYP2C9; half-life = 2 hours; excretion = urine (66%), faeces (20–25%). | Inflammatory pain and heavy menstrual bleeding. | As per diclofenac. |
| Mofezolac | Comes in free form. | As per diclofenac. | PO. | Not available. | Musculoskeletal and joint pain. | As per diclofenac. |
| Morniflumate | Comes in free acid form; niflumic acid derivative. | As per diclofenac. | PO, rectal. | Not available. | Inflammatory conditions. | As per diclofenac. |
| Nabumetone | Comes in free acid form; practically insoluble in water, freely soluble in acetone; degrades on contact with air and light. | As per diclofenac. | PO. | Protein binding = 99%; hepatically metabolised; half-life = 24 hours; excretion = urine (80%), faeces (9%). | Osteoarthritis; rheumatoid arthritis. | As per diclofenac. |
| Naproxen | Comes in free acid and sodium form; practically insoluble in water in free form, freely soluble in water (sodium salt), fairly soluble in most organic solvents. Degrades on contact with air and light. Propionic acid derivative. | As per diclofenac. | PO. | Bioavailability = ?; protein binding > 99.5%; volume of distribution = 10% of bodyweight; half-life = 12–15 hours; excretion = urine (95%), faeces (<3%). | Rheumatoid arthritis; osteoarthritis; ankylosing spondylitis; juvenile idiopathic arthritis; inflammatory pain; heavy menstrual bleeding. | As per diclofenac. less prone to causing thrombotic events compared to other non-selective NSAIDs. |
| Nepafenac | Comes in free form; related to amfenac. | As per diclofenac. | Ophthalmologic. | Unavailable. | Inflammation and pain following cataract surgery. | As per bromfenac. |
| Niflumic acid | Comes in free acid form, glycinamide and ethyl ester form; practically insoluble in water, soluble in ethanol, acetone and methanol. Nicotinic acid derivative. | As per diclofenac. | PO, rectal (ethyl ester, morniflumate). | Unavailable. | Musculoskeletal, joint and mouth inflammatory disorders. | As per diclofenac. |
| Oxaprozin | Comes in potassium and free acid forms; degrades upon contact with light. Propionic acid derivative. | As per diclofenac. | PO. | Bioavailability = ?; protein binding > 99.5%; volume of distribution = 0.15–0.25 L/kg; half-life = 50–60 hours; excretion = urine (65), faeces (35%). | Osteoarthritis; rheumatoid arthritis. | As per diclofenac. |
| Oxyphenbutazone | Comes in free form. Phenylbutazone. | As per diclofenac. | PO, Ophthalmologic. | Unavailable. | Ophthalmologic: Episcleritis. Systemic (now seldom used due to adverse effects): ankylosing spondylitis; rheumatoid arthritis; osteoarthritis. | As per bromfenac. For systemic use haematological side effects such as aplastic anaemia; agranulocytosis; leucopenia; neutropenia; etc. |
| Phenazone | No data. | As per diclofenac. | PO, otolaryngologic. | Protein binding < 10%; half-life = 12 hours; hepatic metabolised; excretion = urine (primary), faeces. | Acute otitis media. | Nephrotoxicity and haematologic toxicity and other AEs typical of NSAIDs. |
| Phenylbutazone | Comes in free form; practically insoluble in water, freely soluble in most organic solvents; degrades upon contact with light and air. | As per diclofenac. | PO, rectal, topical. | No data available. | Ankylosing spondylitis; acute gout; osteoarthritis; rheumatoid arthritis. | Haematologic toxicity (including agranulocytosis, aplastic anaemia) and AEs typical of NSAIDs. |
| Piketoprofen | Comes in free form. | As per diclofenac. | Topical. | N/A. | Musculoskeletal, joint, peri-articular and soft-tissue disorders. | As per other topical NSAIDs. |
| Piroxicam | Comes in free acid and betadex salt forms; practically insoluble in water, slightly soluble in ethanol; degrades on contact with air and light. Enolic acid derivative. | As per diclofenac. | PO, topical. | Protein binding = 99%; extensively hepatically metabolised; half-life = 36–45 hours; excretion = urine, faeces. | Rheumatoid arthritis, osteoarthritis, ankylosing spondylitis and sports injuries (topical use). | As per diclofenac. |
| Proglumetacin | Comes in maleate salt form; indometacin derivative. | As per diclofenac. | PO, rectal, topical. | Not available. | Musculoskeletal and joint disorders. | As per diclofenac. |
| Proquazone | Comes in free form. | As per diclofenac. | PO, rectal. | Not available. | As per diclofenac. | As per diclofenac. |
| Pranoprofen | No data. | As per diclofenac. | PO, ophthalmologic. | Not available. | Pain, inflammation and fever. | As per diclofenac. |
| Salamidacetic acid | Comes in sodium and diethylamine salt forms; salicylate. | As per diclofenac. | PO. | Unavailable. | Musculoskeletal disorders. | As per diclofenac. |
| Salicylamide | Fairly insoluble in water and chloroform; soluble in most other organic solvents; salicylate. | As per diclofenac. | PO, topical. | No data. | Muscular and rheumatic diseases. | As per diclofenac. |
| Salol | No data. | As per diclofenac. | PO, topical. | No data. | Lower urinary tract infections. | As per diclofenac. |
| Salsalate | Degrades upon contact with air; salicylate derivative. | As per diclofenac. | PO. | Hepatic metabolism; half-life = 7–8 hours; excretion = urine. | Rheumatoid arthritis, osteoarthritis. | As per diclofenac. |
| Sodium salicylate | Freely soluble in water; degrades upon contact with air and light; salicylate. | As per diclofenac. | PO, IV, topical. | No data. | Pain, fever and rheumatic conditions. | Cardiac problems; otherwise As per diclofenac. |
| Sulindac | Comes in free acid and sodium salt forms; practically insoluble in water and hexane, very slightly soluble in most organic solvents. Degrades upon contact with light. Acetic acid derivative. | As per diclofenac. | PO, rectal. | Bioavailability = 90%; protein binding = 93% (sulindac), 98% (active metabolite); hepatic metabolism; excretion = urine (50%), faeces (25%). | Rheumatoid arthritis; osteoarthritis; gout; ankylosing spondylitis; inflammatory pain. | As per diclofenac. |
| Suxibuzone | Practically insoluble in water, soluble in ethanol and acetone; phenylbutazone. | As per diclofenac. | PO, topical. | No data. | Musculoskeletal and joint disorders. | As per phenylbutazone. |
| Tenoxicam | Comes as free acid; practically insoluble in water, fairly insoluble in organic solvents; degrades upon contact with light. | As per diclofenac. | PO, rectal. | Bioavailability = 100% (oral), 80% (rectal); protein binding = 99%; volume of distribution = 0.15 L/kg; half-life = 60–75 hours; excretion = urine (67%), faeces (33%). | Osteoarthritis; rheumatoid arthritis; soft tissue injury. | As per diclofenac. |
| Tetridamine | No data. | As per diclofenac. | Vaginal. | No data. | Vaginitis. | As per diclofenac. |
| Tiaprofenic acid | Comes as free acid; practically insoluble in water but freely soluble in most organic solvents; propionic acid derivative; degrades upon contact with light. Propionic acid derivative. | As per diclofenac. | PO. | Protein binding > 99%; volume of distribution = 0.1–0.2 L/kg; hepatic metabolism; half-life = 2–4 hours. | Ankylosing spondylitis; osteoarthritis; rheumatoid arthritis; fibrosis; capsulitis; soft-tissue disorders. | As per diclofenac. |
| Tiaramide | No data. | As per diclofenac. | PO. | No data. | Pain; inflammation. | As per diclofenac. |
| Tinoridine | No data. | As per diclofenac. | No data. | No data. | Pain; inflammation. | As per diclofenac. |
| Tolfenamic acid | Comes as free acid; practically insoluble in water; degrades upon contact with light; anthranilic acid. | As per diclofenac. | PO. | Protein binding = 99%; half-life = 2 hours; hepatically metabolised; excretion = urine (90%), faeces. | Migraine; osteoarthritis; rheumatoid arthritis; dysmenorrhoea. | As per diclofenac. |
| Tolmetin | Comes in sodium salt form; freely soluble in water, slightly soluble in ethanol, freely soluble in methanol. Acetic acid derivative. | As per diclofenac. | PO. | Protein binding > 99%; volume of distribution = 7–10 L; half-life = 1 hour; excretion = urine (90%). | Osteoarthritis; rheumatoid arthritis. | As per diclofenac. |
| Ufenamate | No data. | No data. | Topical. | No data. | Inflammatory skin disorders. | As per other topical NSAIDs. |
COX-2 selective inhibitors
| Celecoxib | Comes in free form; practically insoluble in water, fairly soluble in organic solvents. Degrades on contact with light and moisture. Sulfonamide. | Selective COX-2 inhibitor. | PO. | Protein binding = 97%; hepatic metabolism, mostly via CYP2C9; faeces (57%), urine (27%). | Rheumatoid arthritis; osteoarthritis; ankylosing spondylitis; pain due to dysmenorrhoea or injury. | As per non-selective NSAIDs. More prone to causing thrombotic events than most of them, however, except diclofenac. |
| Etodolac | Comes in free form; practically insoluble in water, freely soluble in acetone and dehydrated alcohol. Acetic acid derivative. | As per celecoxib. | PO. | Bioavailability = ?; protein binding > 99%; volume of distribution = 0.41 L/kg; half-life = 6–7 hours; excretion = urine (73%). | Rheumatoid arthritis, including juvenile idiopathic arthritis; osteoarthritis; acute pain. | As per diclofenac. |
| Etoricoxib | Comes in free form; sulfonamide. | As per celecoxib. | PO. | Bioavailability = 100%; protein binding = 91.4%; volume of distribution = 120 L; half-life = 22 hours; hepatic metabolism; excretion = urine (70%), faeces (20%). | Acute pain; gout; osteoarthritis. | As per diclofenac. |
| Lumiracoxib† | Comes in free form; acetic acid derivative. | As per celecoxib. | PO. | Bioavailability = 74%; protein binding > 98%; extensive hepatic metabolism, mostly via CYP2C9; half-life = 3–6 hours; excretion = Urine (50%), faeces (50%). | Osteoarthritis. | As above, plus hepatotoxicity. |
| Meloxicam | Comes in free form; fairly insoluble in water and in most organic solvents; oxicam derivative. | As per celecoxib. | PO, rectal. | Bioavailability = 89%; protein binding > 99%; volume of distribution = 0.1–0.2 L/kg; half-life = 22–24 hours; extensive hepatic metabolism; excretion = urine (45%), faeces (47%). | Osteoarthritis; rheumatoid arthritis. | As per diclofenac. |
| Nimesulide | Comes in free and betadex form; practically insoluble in water and ethanol, soluble in acetone. | As per celecoxib. | PO, rectal, topical. | Unavailable. | Acute pain; dysmenorrhoea; sprains (topical); tendinitis. | As per diclofenac. |
| Parecoxib | Comes in sodium salt form; sulfonamide. | As per celecoxib. | IM, IV. | Plasma binding = 98%; volume of distribution = 55 L; hepatic metabolism, mostly via CYP2C9, CYP3A4; half-life = 8 hours; excretion = urine (70%). | Postoperative pain. | As per diclofenac. |
| Rofecoxib† | Comes in free form; sulfonamide. | As per celecoxib. | PO. | Bioavailability = 93%; protein binding = 87%; hepatic metabolism; half-life = 17 hours. | Acute pain; osteoarthritis; rheumatoid arthritis. | As per diclofenac. |
| Valdecoxib† | Comes in free form; sulfonamide. | As per celecoxib. | PO. | Bioavailability = 83%; protein binding = 98%; hepatic metabolism, mostly via CYP3A4 and CYP2C9; half-life = 8.11 hours; excretion = urine (90%). | Pain from dysmenorrhoea; rheumatoid arthritis; osteoarthritis. | As above and also potentially fatal skin reactions (e.g. toxic epidermal necrolysis). |
Opioids
Those with a morphine skeleton
| Buprenorphine | Comes in free and hydrochloride salt forms; fairly insoluble in water, soluble in ethanol, methanol and acetone; degrades upon contact with light. | Partial agonist at the mu opioid receptor; agonist at delta opioid receptor; antagonist at kappa opioid receptor. | Sublingual, transdermal, IM, IV, intranasal, epidural, SC. | Bioavailability = 79% (sublingual); protein binding = 96%: volume of distribution = 97–187 L/kg; half-life = 20–36 hours; excretion = urine, faeces. | Opioid dependence, moderate-severe pain. | As per codeine, respiratory effects are subject to a ceiling effect. |
| Codeine | Comes in free form, hydrochloride salt, sulfate salt and phosphate salts; soluble in boiling water (free form), freely soluble in ethanol (free form), soluble/freely soluble in water (salt forms); sensitive to degradation by light. Methoxy analogue of morphine. | Metabolised to morphine, which activates the opioid receptors. | PO, IM, IV. | Extensive hepatic metabolism, mostly via CYP2D6, to morphine; half-life = 3–4 hours; excretion = urine (86%). | Mild-moderate pain, often in combination with paracetamol or ibuprofen. | Constipation, dependence, sedation, itching, nausea, vomiting and respiratory depression. |
| Diamorphine | Comes in hydrochloride salt form; freely soluble in water, soluble in alcohol; degrades upon contact with light. Diacetyl derivative of morphine. | Rapidly hydrolysed to 6-acetylmorphine and then to morphine after crossing the blood-brain barrier which in turn activates the opioid receptors in the CNS. | IM, intrathecal, intranasal, PO, IV, SC. | Extensively metabolised to morphine with 6-acetylmorphine as a possible intermediate. Mostly excreted in urine. | Severe pain (including labour pain); cough due to terminal lung cancer; angina; left ventricular failure. | As per codeine. Higher potential for abuse compared to other opioids due to its rapid penetration of the blood-brain barrier. |
| Dihydrocodeine | Comes in freebase, hydrochloride, phosphate, polistirex, thiocyanate, tartrate, bitartrate and hydrogen tartrate salt forms; freely soluble in water, practically insoluble in organic solvents (hydrogen tartrate salt); degrades upon contact with air and light. | Opioid receptor agonist. | IM, IV, PO, SC. | Bioavailability = 20%; extensive hepatic metabolism, partly via CYP2D6 to dihydromorphine and CYP3A4 to nordihydrocodeine; half-life = 3.5 –5 hours; excretion = urine. | Moderate-severe pain; usually in combination with paracetamol and/or aspirin. | As per codeine. |
| Ethylmorphine | Comes in freebase, hydrochloride, camphorate and camsilate salt forms; soluble in water and alcohol; degrades upon contact with light. | Opioid receptor ligand. | PO. | No data. | Cough suppressant. | As per codeine. |
| Hydrocodone | Comes in hydrochloride/tartrate salt form; freely soluble in water, practically insoluble in most organic solvents; degrades upon contact with light/air. | Opioid receptor ligand. | PO. | Protein binding = 19%; extensively hepatically metabolised, mostly via CYP3A4, but via CYP2D6 to a lesser extent to hydromorphone; half-life = 8 hours; excretion = urine. | Chronic pain. | As per codeine. |
| Hydromorphone | Comes in hydrochloride salt form; freely soluble in water, fairly insoluble in organic solvents; degrades upon contact with light or temperatures outside 15 to 35 °C (59 to 95 °F). | Opioid receptor agonist. | IM, IV, PO, SC. | Bioavailability = 50–62% (oral); protein binding = 8–19%; extensively hepatically metabolised; half-life = 2–3 hours; excretion = urine. | Moderate-severe pain; cough. | As per codeine. |
| Morphine | Comes in freebase form, hydrochloride salt, sulfate salt and tartrate salt forms; soluble in water; degrades in the presence of light. | Opioid receptor agonist (μ, δ, κ). | IM, intrathecal, PO, IV, SC, rectal. | Protein binding = 35%; extensive hepatic metabolism, with some metabolism occur in the gut after oral administration; half-life = 2 hours; excretion = urine (90%). | Moderate-severe pain. | As per codeine. |
| Nicomorphine | Dinicotinic acid ester derivative of morphine. | As per morphine. | IM, IV, PO, rectal, SC. | No available data. | Moderate-severe pain. | As per codeine. |
| Oxycodone | Comes in freebase, hydrochloride and terephthalate salt forms; freely soluble in water and practically insoluble in organic solvents; degrades upon contact with air. | Opioid receptor agonist. | PO. | Bioavailability = 60–87%; protein binding = 45%; volume of distribution = 2.6 L/kg; extensively metabolised in the liver via CYP3A4 and to a lesser extent via CYP2D6 to oxymorphone; half-life = 2–4 hours; excretion = urine (83%). | Moderate-severe pain. | As per codeine. |
| Oxymorphone | Comes in hydrochloride salt form; fairly soluble in water (1 in 4), practically insoluble in most organic solvents; degrades upon contact with air, light and temperatures outside 15 °C to 30 °C. | As per morphine. | PO, IM, SC. | Bioavailability = 10% (oral); protein binding = 10–12%; volume of distribution = 1.94–4.22 L/kg; hepatic metabolism; half-life = 7–9 hours, 9–11 hours (XR); excretion = urine, faeces. | Postoperative analgesia/anaesthesia; moderate-severe pain. | As per codeine. |
Morphinans
| Butorphanol | Comes in tartrate salt form; sparingly soluble in water, insoluble in most organic solvents; degrades upon contact with air and at temperatures outside the range of 15 °C and 30 °C. | Kappa opioid receptor agonist; mu opioid receptor partial agonist. | IM, IV, intranasal. | Bioavailability = 60–70% (intranasal); protein binding = 80%; volume of distribution = 487 L; hepatic metabolism, mostly via hydroxylation; excretion = urine (mostly); half-life = 4.6 hours. | Moderate-severe pain, including labour pain. | As above, but with a higher propensity for causing hallucinations and delusions. Respiratory depression is subject to ceiling effect. |
| Levorphanol | Comes in tartrate salt form; fairly insoluble in water (1 in 50) and fairly insoluble in ethanol, chloroform and ether; unstable outside of 15 °C and 30 °C; phenanthrene derivative. | Mu opioid; NMDA antagonist; SNRI. | PO, IM, IV, SC. | Protein binding = 40%; extensive first-pass metabolism; half-life = 12–16 hours, 30 hours (repeated dosing). | Acute/chronic pain. | As per codeine. |
| Nalbuphine | Comes primarily as its hydrochloride salt. | Full agonist at kappa opioid receptors, partial agonist/antagonist at the mu opioid receptors. | IM, IV, SC. | Protein binding = not significant; hepatic metabolism; half-life = 5 hours; excretion = urine, faeces. | Pain; anaesthesia supplement; opioid-induced pruritus. | As per codeine. Respiratory depression is subject to ceiling effect. |
Benzomorphans
| Dezocine | No data available. | Mixed opioid agonist-antagonist. | IM, IV. | Volume of distribution = 9–12 L/kg; half-life = 2.2–2.7 hours. | Moderate-severe pain. | As per codeine. |
| Eptazocine | Comes as hydrobromide salt. | As per morphine. | IM, SC. | No data. | Moderate-severe pain. | As per codeine. |
| Pentazocine | Comes in free, hydrochloride and lactate salt forms; fairly insoluble in water (1:30 or less), more soluble in ethanol and chloroform; degrades upon contact with air and light. | Kappa opioid receptor agonist; mu opioid receptor antagonist/partial agonist. | IM, IV, SC. | Bioavailability = 60–70%; protein binding = 60%; hepatic metabolism; half-life = 2–3 hours; excretion = urine (primary), faeces. | Moderate-severe pain. | As per codeine. Respiratory effects are subject to a ceiling effect. |
Phenylpiperidines
| Anileridine | Comes in free, hydrochloride and phosphate forms; fairly insoluble in water, soluble in ethanol, ether and chloroform; degrades upon contact with air and light. | Mu opioid receptor agonist. | IM, IV. | No data. | Moderate-severe pain. | As per codeine. |
| Ketobemidone | Comes in hydrochloride salt form; freely soluble in water, soluble in ethanol and fairly insoluble in dichloromethane. | Mu opioid; NMDA antagonist. | PO, IM, IV, rectal. | Bioavailability = 34% (oral), 44% (rectal); half-life = 2–3.5 hours. | Moderate-severe pain. | As per other opioids. |
| Pethidine | Comes in hydrochloride form; very soluble in water, sparingly soluble in ether, soluble in ethanol; degrades upon contact with air and light. | Mu opioid receptor agonist with some serotonergic effects. | IM, IV, PO, SC. | Bioavailability = 50–60%; protein binding = 65–75%; hepatic metabolism; half-life = 2.5–4 hours; excretion = urine (primarily). | Moderate-severe pain. | As per other opioids; and seizures, anxiety, mood changes and serotonin syndrome. |
Open-chain opioids
| Dextromoramide | Comes in tartrate salt and free forms; soluble in water (tartrate salt). | Mu opioid. | IM, IV, PO, rectal. | No data available. | Severe pain. | As per other opioids. |
| Dextropropoxyphene | Comes in free form, hydrochloride and napsilate salt forms; very soluble in water (HCl), practically insoluble in water (napsilate); degrades upon contact with light and air. | Mu opioid. | PO. | Protein binding = 80%; hepatic metabolism; half-life = 6–12 hours, 30–36 hours (active metabolite). | Mild-moderate pain. | As per other opioids, plus ECG changes. |
| Dipipanone | Comes in hydrochloride salt form; practically insoluble in water and ether, soluble in acetone and ethanol. | Mu opioid. | PO, often in combination with cyclizine. | Half-life = 20 hours. | Moderate-severe pain. | Less sedating than morphine, otherwise as per morphine. |
| Levacetylmethadol† | Comes in hydrochloride salt form. | As above plus nicotinic acetylcholine receptor antagonist. | PO. | Protein binding = 80%; half-life = 2.6 days. | Opioid dependence. | As per other opioids, plus ventricular rhythm disorders. |
| Levomethadone | Comes in hydrochloride salt form; soluble in water and alcohol; degrades upon contact with light. | Mu opioid; NMDA antagonist. | PO. | No data. | As per methadone. | As per methadone. |
| Meptazinol | Comes in hydrochloride salt form; soluble in water, ethanol and methanol, fairly insoluble in acetone; unstable at temperatures greater than 25 °C. | Mixed opioid agonist-antagonist, partial agonist at mu-1 receptor; cholinergic actions exist. | IM, IV, PO. | Bioavailability = 8.69% (oral); protein binding = 27.1%; half-life = 2 hours; excretion = urine. | Moderate-severe pain; perioperative analgesia; renal colic. | As per pentazocine. |
| Methadone | Comes in hydrochloride salt form; soluble in water and ethanol; degrades upon contact with air and light and outside the temperature range of 15 °C and 30 °C. | Mu opioid; NMDA antagonist. | IM, IV, PO, SC. | Bioavailability = 36–100% (mean: 70–80%); protein binding = 81–97% (mean: 87%); volume of distribution = 1.9-8 L/kg (mean: 4 L/kg); hepatic metabolism, mostly via CYP3A4, CYP2B6 and to a lesser extent: CYP2C9, CYP2C19, CYP2D6 & CYP2C8; half-life = 5–130 hours (mean: 20–35 hours); excretion = urine (20–50%), faeces. | Opioid addiction; chronic pain. | As per other opioids, plus QT interval prolongation. |
| Piritramide | Comes in free or tartrate salt forms. | Mu opioid. | IM, IV, SC. | No data available. | Severe pain. | As per other opioids. |
| Tapentadol | Comes in free and hydrochloride salt forms. | Mu opioid and norepinephrine reuptake inhibitor. | PO. | Bioavailability = 32%; protein binding = 20%; hepatic metabolism, mostly via CYP2C9, CYP2C19, CYP2D6; excretion = urine (70%), faeces; half-life = 4 hours. | Moderate-severe pain. | As per other opioids; less likely to cause nausea, vomiting and constipation. |
| Tilidine | Comes in hydrochloride salt form; soluble in water, ethanol and dichloromethane; degrades upon contact with light. | Mu opioid metabolite, nortilidine. | PO. | No data. | Moderate-severe pain. | As per other opioids. |
| Tramadol | Comes in hydrochloride salt form; freely soluble in water and methanol, insoluble in acetone; degrades at temperatures less than 15 °C and 30 °C and upon contact with light. | Mu opioid (mostly via its active metabolite, O-desmethyltramadol) and SNRI. | IM, IV, PO, rectal. | Bioavailability = 70–75% (oral), 100% (IM); protein binding = 20%; hepatic metabolism, via CYP3A4 and CYP2D6; half-life = 6 hours; excretion = urine, faeces. | Moderate-severe pain. | As per other opioids but with less respiratory depression and constipation. Psychiatric AEs reported. Serotonin syndrome possible if used in conjunction with other serotonergics. |
Anilidopiperidines
| Alfentanil | Comes in hydrochloride salt form; freely soluble in ethanol, water, methanol; degrades upon contact with air and light. | Mu opioid. | Epidural, IM, IV, intrathecally. | Protein binding = 90%; volume of distribution = small; half-life = 1–2 hours; hepatic metabolism, mostly via CYP3A4; excretion = urine. | Procedural anaesthesia. | As per other opioids. Very sedating. |
| Fentanyl | Comes in free, hydrochloride salt, citrate salt forms; practically insoluble in water (free form), soluble in water (citrate salt form), freely soluble in ethanol and methanol; degrades outside the temperature range of 15 °C and 30 °C and upon contact with light. | Mu opioid. | Buccal, epidermal, IM, IV, intrathecal, intranasal, SC, sublingual. | Bioavailability = 50% (buccal), 89% (intranasal); protein binding = 80%; hepatic metabolism, mostly via CYP3A4; half-life = 219 min; excretion = urine (primary), faeces. | Moderate-severe pain (including labour pain); adjunct to anaesthesia. | As with other opioids, with less nausea, vomiting, constipation and itching and more sedation. |
| Remifentanil | Comes in hydrochloride salt. | Mu opioid. | IV. | Protein binding = 70%; hydrolysed by blood and tissue esterases; half-life = 20 min; excretion = urine (95%). | Anaesthesia maintenance. | As with fentanyl. |
| Sufentanil | Comes in free and citrate salt forms; soluble in water, ethanol and methanol; degrades upon contact with light and temperatures outside 15 °C and 30 °C. | Mu opioid. | Epidural, IV, intrathecal, transdermal. | Protein binding = 90%; half-life = 2.5 hours; excretion = urine (80%). | Adjunct to anaesthesia and moderate-severe pain. | As with fentanyl. |
Other analgesics
| Acetanilide | No data. | Paracetamol prodrug. | PO. | No data. | Pain; fever. | Cancer; AEs of paracetamol. |
| Amitriptyline | Comes in free form and in hydrochloride and embonate salt forms; practically insoluble in water (embonate salt), freely soluble in water (HCl); degrades upon contact with light. | SNRI. | PO. | Hepatic metabolism, via CYP2C19, CYP3A4; active metabolite, nortriptyline; half-life = 9–27 hours; excretion = urine (18%), faeces. | Neuropathic pain; nocturnal enuresis; major depression; migraine prophylaxis; urinary urge incontinence. | Sedation, anticholinergic effects, weight gain, orthostatic hypotension, sinus tachycardia, sexual dysfunction, tremor, dizziness, sweating, agitation, insomnia, anxiety, confusion. |
| Dronabinol | Comes in free form; degrades upon contact with light. | Cannabinoid receptor partial agonist. | PO. | Bioavailability = 10–20%; protein binding = 90–99%; volume of distribution = 10 L/kg; hepatic metabolism; half-life = 25–36 hours, 44–59 hours (metabolites); excretion = faeces (50%), urine (15%). | Refractory chemotherapy-induced nausea and vomiting; anorexia; neuropathic pain. | Dizziness, euphoria, paranoia, somnolence, abnormal thinking, abdominal pain, nausea, vomiting, depression, hallucinations, hypotension, special difficulties, emotional lability, tremors, flushing, etc. |
| Duloxetine | Comes in hydrochloride salt form; slightly soluble in water, freely soluble in methanol; degrades upon contact with light. | SNRI. | PO. | Protein binding > 90%; volume of distribution = 3.4 L/kg; hepatic metabolism, via CYP2D6, CYP1A2; half-life = 12 hours; excretion = urine (70%), faeces (20%). | Major depression; generalised anxiety disorder; neuropathic pain. | Anticholinergic effects, GI effects, yawning, sweating, dizziness, weakness, sexual dysfunction, somnolence, insomnia, headache, tremor, decreased appetite. |
| Flupirtine | Comes as maleate salt. Chemically related to retigabine. | Potassium channel (Kv7) opener. | PO, rectal. | Bioavailability = 90% (oral), 72.5% (rectal); protein binding = 80%; volume of distribution = 154 L; hepatic metabolism; half-life = 6.5 hours; excretion = urine (72%). | Pain; fibromyalgia; Creutzfeldt–Jakob disease. | Drowsiness, dizziness, heartburn, dry mouth, fatigue and nausea. |
| Gabapentin | Comes in free and enacarbil salt forms; fairly insoluble in ethanol, dichloromethane, fairly soluble in water. | Binds to the α2δ-1 subunit of voltage gated calcium ion channels in the spinal cord. May also modulate NMDA receptors and protein kinase C. | PO. | Half-life = 5–7 hours. | Neuropathic pain; epilepsy. | Fatigue, sedation, dizziness, ataxia, tremor, diplopia, nystagmus, amblyopia, amnesia, abnormal thinking, hypertension, vasodilation, peripheral oedema, dry mouth, weight gain and rash. |
| Milnacipran | No data. | SNRI. | PO. | Bioavailability = 85–90%; protein binding = 13%: volume of distribution = 400 L; hepatic metabolism; half-life = 6–8 hours (L-isomer), 8–10 hours (D-isomer); excretion = urine (55%). | Fibromyalgia. | As per duloxetine, plus hypertension. |
| Nabiximols | Contains cannabidiol and dronabinol in roughly equal concentrations. | As per dronabinol. | Buccal spray. | Not available. | Neuropathic pain and spasticity as part of MS. | As per dronabinol. |
| Nefopam | Comes in a hydrochloride salt form. Chemically related to orphenadrine. | Unknown; serotonin-norepinephrine-dopamine reuptake inhibitor. | PO, IM. | Protein binding = 73%; half-life = 4 hours; excretion = urine, faeces (8%). | Analgesia, especially postoperative; hiccups. | Has antimuscarinic and sympathomimetic effects. |
| Paracetamol | Comes in free form; practically insoluble in water, freely soluble in ethanol; degrades upon contact with moisture, air and light. | Multiple; inhibits prostaglandin synthesis in the CNS, an active metabolite, AM404, is an anandamide reuptake inhibitor. | PO, IV, IM, rectal. | Protein binding = 10–25%; volume of distribution = 1 L/kg; hepatic metabolism; half-life = 1–3 hours; excretion = urine. | Analgesia and fever reduction. | Hepatotoxicity; hypersensitivity reactions (rare), including Stevens–Johnson syndrome; hypotension (rare; IV). |
| Phenacetin | No data. | Prodrug to paracetamol. | PO. | No data. | Analgesia and fever reduction. | Haematologic, nephrotoxicity, cancer and paracetamol AEs. |
| Pregabalin | Comes in free form. | As per gabapentin. | PO. | Bioavailability = 90%; half-life = 6.3 hours; hepatic metabolism; excretion = urine (90%). | Neuropathic pain; anxiety; epilepsy. | As per gabapentin. |
| Propacetamol | Freely soluble in water; degrades upon contact with moisture. | Prodrug to paracetamol. | IM, IV. | No data available. | Analgesia and fever reduction. | As per paracetamol. |
| Ziconotide | Peptide. | N-type calcium-channel blocker. | Intrathecal. | Protein binding = 50%; half-life = 2.9–6.5 hours; excretion = urine (<1%). | Chronic pain. | CNS toxicity (abnormal gait, abnormal vision, memory problems, etc.); GI effects. |
Where † indicates products that are no longer marketed.

== Research ==
Some novel and investigational analgesics include subtype-selective voltage-gated sodium channel blockers such as funapide and raxatrigine, as well as multimodal agents such as ralfinamide.

== See also ==
- Audioanalgesia
- Electroanalgesia
- Pain management
- Patient-controlled analgesia
- Pain in babies
- Congenital analgesia (insensitivity to pain)
