= C26H35FO6 =

The molecular formula C_{26}H_{35}FO_{6} (molar mass: 462.558 g/mol) may refer to:

- Amcinafal (also known as triamcinolone pentanonide)
- Amelometasone
