= C18H20N2 =

The molecular formula C_{18}H_{20}N_{2} (molar mass: 264.36 g/mol, exact mass: 264.1626 u) may refer to:

- Amezepine
- Apparicine
- Ciclopramine
- Mianserin
- McN-5908
