= Electroanalgesia =

Pain relief by electrical means

Electroanalgesia is a form of analgesia, or pain relief, that uses electricity to ease pain and belongs to a type of neurotherapy. Electrical devices can be internal or external, at the site of pain (local) or delocalized throughout the whole body. It works by interfering with the electric currents of pain signals, inhibiting them from reaching the brain and inducing a response; different from traditional analgesics, such as opiates which mimic natural endorphins and NSAIDs (non-steroidal anti-inflammatory drugs) that help relieve inflammation and stop pain at the source. Electroanalgesia has a lower addictive potential and poses less health threats to the general public, but can cause serious health problems, even death, in people with other electrical devices such as pacemakers or internal hearing aids, or with heart problems.

== History ==
The first cases of electroanalgesia were documented by Greek scholars, Plutarch and Socrates, who noticed numbing effects of standing in pools of water on a beach that contained electric fish (icthyoelectroanalgesia). The Chinese practice of acupuncture, dating back to 3000 BCE, also utilizes the properties of electroanalgesia by stimulating specific nerves to produce electrical signals which produce pleasurable responses in the brain. Another ancient analgesic method, aging back to 5000 BCE in Sumer, is to use natural minerals, vitamins, and herbs, usually in a mixture with other natural products. Technology invented specifically for electroanalgesia emerged at the beginning of the 1900s.

== Technology ==
Advancements in technology within the past fifteen years have created multiple forms of electroanalgesia. Doctors can target specific electrical signals caused by pain and cancel them out using electrical signals, optimally with alternating low and high frequencies.

=== Transcranial electrostimulation ===
A theoretical explanation for the mechanism of pain reduction by transcranial electrostimulation, or TCES, suggests that the electrical stimulation activates the anti-nociceptive system in the brain, resulting in β-endorphin, serotonin and noradrenaline release. TCES can be used on people with cervical pain, chronic lower back syndrome, or migraines. It cannot be used on people with orthopedic or radiological potentially serious spinal conditions, hydrocephalus, epilepsy, glaucoma, malignant hypertension, pacemaker or other implanted electronic device; recent cerebral trauma, nervous system infection, skin lesions at sites of electrode placement; oncological disease; patients undergoing any other treatments for pain; any invasive therapy, e.g. surgery, within the last month. The equipment used is Pulse Mazor Instruments' Pulsatilla 1000, which consists of a headset with three electrodes, two that go behind the ears and one that goes on the forehead, that release set frequencies of electricity at set intervals.

=== Deep brain stimulation ===
Deep brain stimulation, or DBS, was first evaluated as an electroanalgesic in the late 1950s. It works in some chronic pain patients. The mechanism of DBS is unknown. There is some evidence that it decreases pain transmission along sensory discriminative pathways although more recent studies have shown that it has central effects on other brain regions involved in the pain network (Pereira et al. 2007). This method has mainly been used for chronic pain patients after all other options have failed due to potential of intracranial complications (e.g., intracranial hemorrhage, infection, and oculomotor abnormalities). An electrode is "stereotactically" guided to the site using magnetic resonance imaging and once in place, the electrode is activated by subcutaneous leads attached to a pulse generator under the skin. It is effective in treating refractory post-stroke pain, atypical face pain, anaesthesia dolorosa, and deafferentation and somatic pain such as in phantom limb or brachial plexus injury (Boccard et al. 2013).

=== Median nerve stimulation ===
A median nerve stimulator is a medical device that delivers mild electrical impulses to the median nerve, which runs from the upper arm through the wrist and into the hand. The stimulation is used to influence nerve activity and may help manage certain neurological conditions, including symptoms associated with movement disorders. Depending on its intended purpose, the device may be worn externally or implanted beneath the skin.

=== Peripheral nerve stimulation ===
The use of peripheral nerve stimulation, or PNS, for the relief of chronic pain states was first reported over 30 years ago. Recent studies have demonstrated that electrical stimulation of nerves leads to inhibitory input to the pain pathways at the spinal cord level. PNS is most effective in the treatment of neuropathic pain (e.g., posttraumatic neuropathy, diabetic neuropathy) when the nerve lesion is distal to the site of stimulation.

=== Percutaneous electrical nerve stimulation ===
Percutaneous electrical nerve stimulation, or PENS, is used mainly in the treatment of intractable pain associated with chronic low back pain syndrome, cancer, and other disorders. It is a technique involving insertion of an ultra-fine acupuncture needle which probes into the soft tissues or muscles to electrically stimulate nerve fibers in the sclerotomal, myotomal, or dermatomal distribution corresponding to the patient's pain symptoms. PENS is related to both electroacupuncture and transcutaneous electrical nerve stimulation.

=== Percutaneous neuromodulation therapy ===
PENS used to be a term to describe a neurosurgical procedure involving implantation of temporary stimulating electrodes before an SCS device. The term has recently been changed to percutaneous neuromodulation therapy, or PNT. The term PNT was chosen because it more accurately describes the neurophysiologic basis for PENS-induced analgesia.

=== Transcutaneous electrical nerve stimulation ===
Transcutaneous electrical nerve stimulation, or TENS, involves the transmission of electrical energy from an external stimulator to the peripheral nervous system via cutaneously placed conductive gel pads. TENS can be subclassified into two variants:

- low-intensity (1–2 mA), high-frequency (50–100 Hz) TENS; and
- acupuncture-like high-intensity (15–20 mA), low-frequency (1–5 Hz) or "dense-disperse" TENS.

The purported mechanism of action of TENS invokes both spinal supraspinal theories.

=== Transcutaneous acupoint electrical stimulation ===
Transcutaneous acupoint electrical stimulation, or TAES, is a variant of TENS therapy that involves applying cutaneous electrodes at classical Chinese acupoints and stimulating with alternating high- and low-frequency electric current ("dense-disperse"). Acupoint stimulation is as effective as dermatomal stimulation in producing an analgesic-sparing effect after lower abdominal surgery

=== H-wave therapy ===
H-wave therapy (HWT) is a form of electrical stimulation that produces a direct, localized effect on the conduction of underlying nerves. The electrical stimulation used in HWT differs from other forms of electrical stimulation such as TENS in terms of its waveform; it is intended to emulate the H waveform found in nerve signals, thus permitting the machine to use less power while attaining greater and deeper penetration of its low-frequency current. The waves used in HWT are distinct from the H-waves that are part of electromyography. It has been used in the treatment of pain related to diabetic neuropathy, muscle sprains, temporomandibular joint disorders, type I complex regional pain syndrome as well as the healing of wounds such as diabetic ulcers. This electroanalgesic modality was originally recommended as an alternative to TENS for dental analgesia. In a 1999 randomized controlled trial involving a mechanical pain model, the analgesic effects of HWT were found to be short-lasting and identical to those provided by TENS therapy. HWT has not been shown effective in reducing pain in cases other than diabetic neuropathy, nor has it been shown effective in reducing edema or swelling, and it has specifically not been shown effective in treating chronic pain due to ischemia.

=== Interferential current therapy ===
Interferential current therapy, or ICT, is another variant of TENS that uses the principle of amplitude modulation to decrease the discomfort of stimulating deeper tissues (e.g., muscle) when using transcutaneously applied electric current. A combination of different stimulation frequencies are used (i.e., one fixed at 4 kHz and another within a variable range) to generate frequencies between 4 and 250 Hz which are alleged to more effectively penetrate the soft tissues while producing less discomfort at the skin surface. With ICT, its postulated mechanism of analgesic action is through direct stimulation of muscle fibers rather than nerves, allegedly improving muscle blood flow and promoting the healing process. Although ICT is used widely in the physiotherapy and rehabilitative medicine settings, there is a dearth of rigorously controlled studies to justify its effectiveness in the management of either acute or chronic pain syndromes.

=== Piezo-electric current therapy ===
Piezo-electric current therapy, or PECT, is an analgesic technique based on the principle that mechanical deformation of a motorized piezoelectric ceramic rod produces a burst of 10 electrical pulses (five positive and five negative), each lasting 2–3 ms. Each electrical burst lasts for 50 to 250 ms (depending on the motor speed set) and generates a current of approximately 25 mA. The application of PECT to the skin for 2 min produces a tolerable "pricking" pain sensation associated with a neurogenic inflammatory response lasting 3–4 h. The extent and duration of this inhibitory process is directly related to the intensity of the applied stimulus and is alleged to be associated with the release of endogenous endorphins.

== Controversies ==
Electroanalgesia poses serious health problems in those patients who need other electrical equipment in their bodies, such as pacemakers and hearing aids, because the electrical signals of the multiple devices can interfere with each other and fail. People with heart problems, such as irregular heartbeat, are also at risk because the devices can throw off the normal electrical signal of the heart.

== See also ==
- Analgesic
- Audioanalgesia
- Pain management
- Patient-controlled analgesia
- Pain in babies
- Congenital analgesia (insensitivity to pain)
