= C15H16N2O =

The molecular formula C_{15}H_{16}N_{2}O (molar mass: 240.30 g/mol, exact mass: 240.1263 u) may refer to:

- Ameltolide
- Benmoxin, or mebamoxine
- Phenatine
