= C18H21NO5 =

The molecular formula C_{18}H_{21}NO_{5} (molar mass: 331.363 g/mol, exact mass: 331.1420 u) may refer to:

- Amikhelline
- Protokylol
