= C10H16N2O3S =

The molecular formula C_{10}H_{16}N_{2}O_{3}S (molar mass : 244.31 g/mol) may refer to:

- Amidephrine, an alpha-adrenergic agonist
- Biotin, a water-soluble B-complex vitamin
