= C19H20F3N3O3 =

The molecular formula C_{19}H_{20}F_{3}N_{3}O_{3} (molar mass: 395.38 g/mol, exact mass: 395.1457 u) may refer to:

- Morniflumate
- Orbifloxacin
