= C28H40O7 =

The molecular formula C_{28}H_{40}O_{7} (molar mass: 488.61 g/mol, exact mass: 488.2774 u) may refer to:

- Amebucort, a synthetic glucocorticoid corticosteroid
- Hydrocortisone buteprate, a topical steroid
