= Prenatal perception =

Study of the different types of sensory perception of fetuses during pregnancy

Prenatal perception is the study of the extent of somatosensory and other types of perception during pregnancy. In practical terms, this means the study of fetuses; none of the accepted indicators of perception are present in embryos. Studies of this type inform the abortion controversy, along with certain related pieces of legislation in countries affected by that debate. As of 2022, there is not any scientific consensus on whether a fetus can feel pain.

== Prenatal hearing ==
Numerous studies have provided evidence that a fetus can respond to auditory stimuli. The earliest responses to sound have been observed at around 16 weeks of gestation, while the auditory system is considered fully functional between 25 and 29 weeks of gestation. Between 33 and 41 weeks of gestation, the fetus is able to distinguish its mother’s voice from those of others.

== Prenatal pain ==
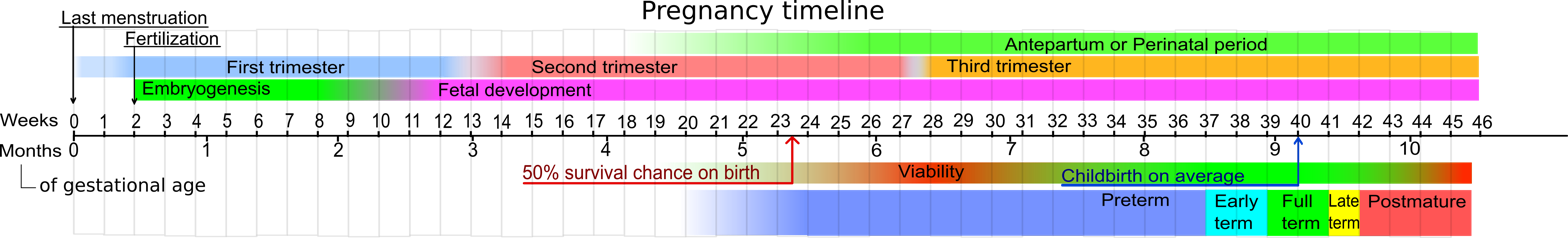
Pregnancy timeline.

The hypothesis that human fetuses are capable of perceiving pain during the first trimester has little evidence, although fetuses at 14 weeks may respond to touch. A multidisciplinary systematic review from 2005 found limited evidence that thalamocortical pathways begin to function "around 29 to 30 weeks' gestational age", only after which a fetus is capable of feeling pain.

In March 2010, the Royal College of Obstetricians and Gynecologists submitted a report, concluding that "Current research shows that the sensory structures are not developed or specialized enough to respond to pain in a fetus of less than 24 weeks",

The neural regions and pathways that are responsible for pain experience remain under debate but it is generally accepted that pain from physical trauma requires an intact pathway from the periphery, through the spinal cord, into the thalamus and on to regions of the cerebral cortex including the primary sensory cortex (S1), the insular cortex and the anterior cingulated cortex. Fetal pain is not possible before these necessary neural pathways and structures have developed.

The report specifically identified the anterior cingulate as the area of the cerebral cortex responsible for processing of pain. The anterior cingulate is part of the cerebral cortex, which begins to develop in the fetus at week 26. A co-author of that report reviewed the evidence in 2020, specifically the functionality of the thalamic projections into the cortical subplate, and posited "an immediate and unreflective pain experience...from as early as 12 weeks."

There is a consensus among developmental neurobiologists that the establishment of thalamocortical connections (at weeks 22–34, reliably at 29) is a critical event with regard to fetal perception of pain, as they allow peripheral sensory information to arrive at the cortex.

Electroencephalography indicates that the capacity for functional pain perception in premature infants does not exist before 29 or 30 weeks; a 2005 meta-analysis states that withdrawal reflexes and changes of heart rates and hormone levels in response to invasive procedures are reflexes that do not indicate fetal pain.

Several types of evidence suggest that a fetus does not awaken during its time in the womb. Much of the literature concerning fetal pain simply extrapolates from findings and research of premature babies. The presence of such chemicals as adenosine, pregnanolone, and prostaglandin-D_{2} in both human and animal fetuses, indicate that the fetus is both sedated and anesthetized when in the womb. These chemicals are oxidized with the newborn's first few breaths and washed out of the tissues, increasing consciousness. If the fetus is asleep throughout gestation then the possibility of fetal pain is greatly minimized, although some studies found that the adenosine levels in third-trimester fetuses are only slightly greater than those in adults' blood.

=== Fetal anesthesia ===
Direct fetal analgesia is used for only a minority of prenatal surgeries.

Some caution that unnecessary use of fetal anesthetic may pose potential health risks to the mother. "In the context of abortion, fetal analgesia would be used solely for beneficence toward the fetus, assuming fetal pain exists. This interest must be considered in concert with maternal safety and fetal effectiveness of any proposed anesthetic or analgesic technique. For instance, general anesthesia increases abortion morbidity and mortality for women and substantially increases the cost of abortion. Although placental transfer of many opioids and sedative-hypnotics has been determined, the maternal dose required for fetal analgesia is unknown, as is the safety for women at such doses. Given the maternal risk involved and the lack of evidence of any potential benefit to the fetus, administering fetal anesthesia for abortion is not recommended.

Fetal pain legislation may make abortions more difficult to obtain, because abortion clinics lack the equipment and expertise to supply fetal anesthesia. Currently, anesthesia is administered directly to fetuses only while they are undergoing surgery.

Doctors for a Woman's Choice on Abortion state that the majority of surgical abortions in Britain are already performed with general anesthesia, which also affects the fetus. In a letter to the British Medical Journal in April 1997, they deemed the discussion "unhelpful to women and to the scientific debate" despite a report in the British Medical Journal that "the theoretical possibility that the fetus may feel pain (albeit much earlier than most embryologists and physiologists consider likely) with the procedure of legal abortion". Yet if mothers' general anesthesia were enough to anesthetise the fetus, all fetuses would be born sleepy after a cesarean section performed in general anesthesia, which is not the case. Dr. Carlo V. Bellieni also agrees that the anesthesia that women receive for fetal surgery is not sufficient to anesthetize the fetus.

== United States legislation ==
=== Federal legislation ===
In 1985, questions about fetal pain were raised during congressional hearings concerning the movie The Silent Scream.

In 2013 during the 113th Congress, Representative Trent Franks introduced a bill named the "Pain-Capable Unborn Child Protection Act" (H.R. 1797). It passed in the House on June 18, 2013, and was received in the U.S. Senate, read twice, and referred to the Judiciary Committee.

In 2004 during the 108th Congress, Senator Sam Brownback introduced a bill named the "Unborn Child Pain Awareness Act" for the stated purpose of "ensur[ing] that women seeking an abortion are fully informed regarding the pain experienced by their unborn child", which was read twice and referred to committee.

=== State legislation ===
Subsequently, 25 states have examined similar legislation related to fetal pain and/or fetal anesthesia, and in 2010 Nebraska banned abortions after 20 weeks on the basis of fetal pain. Eight states – Arkansas, Georgia, Louisiana, Minnesota, Oklahoma, Alaska, South Dakota, and Texas – have passed laws which introduced information on fetal pain in their state-issued abortion-counseling literature, which one opponent of these laws, the Guttmacher Institute founded by Planned Parenthood, has termed "generally irrelevant" and not in line "with the current medical literature". Arthur Caplan, director of the Center for Bioethics at the University of Pennsylvania, said laws such as these "reduce ... the process of informed consent to the reading of a fixed script created and mandated by politicians not doctors."

== See also ==
- Pain in babies
- Prenatal development
- Texas Senate Bill 5
