= Mofezolac =

Chemical compound

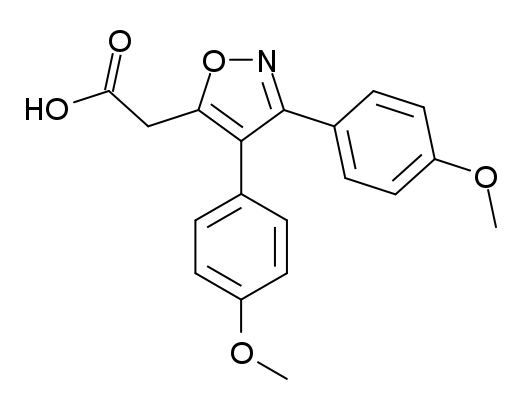

Clinical data
- AHFS/Drugs.com: International Drug Names
- Routes of administration: Oral
- ATC code: none

Legal status
- Legal status: In general: ℞ (Prescription only)

Identifiers
- IUPAC name: [3,4-bis(4-methoxyphenyl)isoxazol-5-yl]acetic acid
- CAS Number: 78967-07-4
- PubChem CID: 4237
- ChemSpider: 4089
- UNII: RVJ0BV3H3Y
- KEGG: D01718
- CompTox Dashboard (EPA): DTXSID1046716

Chemical and physical data
- Formula: C_{19}H_{17}NO_{5}
- Molar mass: 339.347 g·mol^{−1}
- 3D model (JSmol): Interactive image
- SMILES: COC1=CC=C(C=C1)C2=C(ON=C2C3=CC=C(C=C3)OC)CC(=O)O
- InChI: InChI=1S/C19H17NO5/c1-23-14-7-3-12(4-8-14)18-16(11-17(21)22)25-20-19(18)13-5-9-15(24-2)10-6-13/h3-10H,11H2,1-2H3,(H,21,22); Key:DJEIHHYCDCTAAH-UHFFFAOYSA-N

Mofezolac (INN), sold under the name Disopain in Japan, is a nonsteroidal anti-inflammatory drug (NSAID) used for its analgesic and anti-inflammatory actions. It is often prescribed for rheumatoid arthritis, lower back pain, frozen shoulder, and pain management after surgery or trauma. It is also being investigated for potential use in the treatment of neuroinflammation.

Common side effects include abdominal pain, stomach discomfort, nausea, sleepiness, itch, hives, rash, erythema, and edema. Serious side effects include peptic ulcers, gastrointestinal bleeding, asthma attack, jaundice, acute liver failure, and thrombocytopenia. Use is not recommended during pregnancy or breastfeeding.

Mofezolac acts via selective inhibition of the cyclooxygenase COX-1 and consequent suppression of prostaglandin synthesis. It is the most potent and selective reversible COX-1 inhibitor. Studies of ovine COX-1 in complex with mofezolac indicate that the drug forms a combination of electrostatic, H-bond, hydrophobic, and van der Waals contacts with the enzyme active site channel, contributing to mofezolac's high binding affinity.

Mofezolac belongs to the class of isoxazoles and is a substrate of CYP2C9.

It is manufactured and marketed by Nipro ES Pharma Co., Ltd.
