= Amtolmetin guacil =

Chemical compound

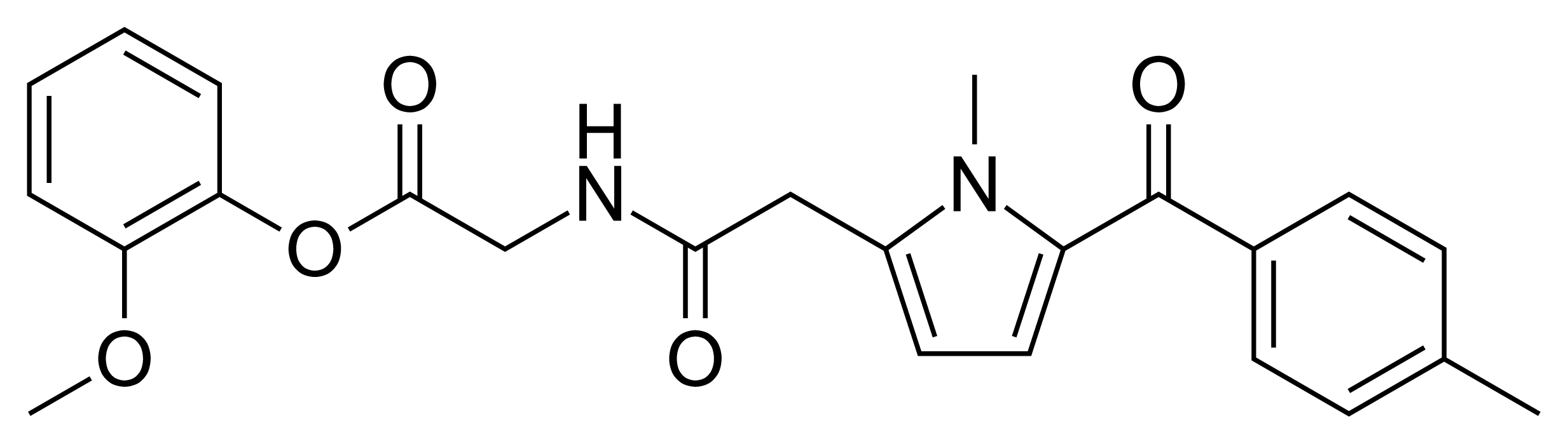

Clinical data
- Other names: ST-679
- ATC code: none

Identifiers
- IUPAC name: (2-methoxyphenyl) 2-[ [2-[1-methyl-5-(4-methylbenzoyl)pyrrol-2-yl]acetyl]ami
- CAS Number: 87344-06-7
- PubChem CID: 65655
- ChemSpider: 59091
- UNII: 323A00CRO9
- KEGG: D07453
- ChEMBL: ChEMBL1766570
- CompTox Dashboard (EPA): DTXSID50236291
- ECHA InfoCard: 100.207.038

Chemical and physical data
- Formula: C_{24}H_{24}N_{2}O_{5}
- Molar mass: 420.465 g·mol^{−1}
- 3D model (JSmol): Interactive image
- SMILES: O=C(c1ccc(n1C)CC(=O)NCC(=O)Oc2ccccc2OC)c3ccc(cc3)C
- InChI: InChI=1S/C24H24N2O5/c1-16-8-10-17(11-9-16)24(29)19-13-12-18(26(19)2)14-22(27)25-15-23(28)31-21-7-5-4-6-20(21)30-3/h4-13H,14-15H2,1-3H3,(H,25,27); Key:CWJNMKKMGIAGDK-UHFFFAOYSA-N

Amtolmetin guacil is a non-steroidal anti-inflammatory drug (NSAID). It is a prodrug of tolmetin sodium.

== Background ==
Tolmetin sodium is an approved NSAID, marketed for the treatment of rheumatoid arthritis, osteoarthritis and juvenile rheumatoid arthritis. In humans, tolmetin sodium is absorbed rapidly with peak plasma levels observed 30 minutes after administration. It is eliminated rapidly with a mean plasma elimination t_{½} of approximately 1 hour. The preparation of slow release formulations or chemical modification of NSAIDs to form prodrugs has been suggested as a method to reduce the gastrotoxicity of these agents.

Amtolmetin guacil is a non-acidic prodrug of tolmetin, having NSAID properties similar to tolmetin with additional analgesic, antipyretic, and gastro protective properties. Amtolmetin is formed by amidation of tolmetin by glycine.

== Pharmacology ==
- Most is absorbed on oral administration. It is concentrated in the gastric wall. Highest concentration is reached 2 hours after administration.
- Amtolmetin guacil can be hydrolysed to produce the metabolites Tolmetin, MED5 and Guiacol.
- Elimination completes in 24 hours. This happens mostly with urine in shape of gluconides products (77%), faecal (7.5%).
- It is advised to take the drug on empty stomach.
- Permanent anti-inflammatory action continues up to 72 hours, with single administration.

== Mechanism of action ==
Amtolmetin guacil stimulates capsaicin receptors present on gastrointestinal walls, because of presence of vanillic moiety and also releases NO which is gastro protective. It also inhibits prostaglandin synthesis and cyclooxygenase (COX).
