= Amatuximab =

Monoclonal antibody

Monoclonal antibody
- Type: Whole antibody
- Source: Chimeric (mouse/human)
- Target: mesothelin

Clinical data
- Other names: MORAb-009
- ATC code: none

Identifiers
- CAS Number: 931402-35-6
- ChemSpider: none
- UNII: 6HP0354G04

Chemical and physical data
- Formula: C_{6394}H_{9870}N_{1694}O_{2024}S_{46}
- Molar mass: 144331.89 g·mol^{−1}

Amatuximab (development code MORAb-009) is a chimeric monoclonal antibody designed for the treatment of cancer. It was developed by Morphotek, Inc.

Amatuximab is a monoclonal antibody that binds to mesothelin (a protein that is made by some cancer cells) and stops the cells from dividing.

== Intellectual property ==
In December 2005 Morphotek signed an exclusive license agreement for MORAb-009 with the National Cancer Institute. Quickly following they opened an Investigational New Drug Application with the FDA in 2006 and initiated Phase I clinical trials. In November 2010, Morphotek (now as an acquisition of Eisai Co. Ltd.) entered a Sponsored Research Agreement (SRA) with Hokkaido University in Sapporo, Japan to perform studies evaluating the use of amatuximab in advanced pancreatic cancer. Specifically, the study was investigating the anti-tumor effect of amatuximab as a single agent as well as in combination with gemcitabine. The FDA granted amatuximab orphan drug status for use in malignant pleural mesothelioma in November 2012, and the European Commission soon followed granting orphan drug status in January 2014.

== Manufacturer financials ==
Morphotek was founded in the year 2000 by Dr. Nicholas Nicolaides, Dr. Philip Sass, and Dr. Luigi Grasso out of Exton, Pennsylvania. The primary focus of the company is development of biological drug products for the treatment of inflammatory disease, cancer, and infectious disease. In 2007 Morphotek was acquired by the pharmaceutical company Eisai and now functions as a subsidiary of Eisai. The annual net income growth of Eisai in the 2017 fiscal year was -28.35%, its sales and revenue growth -1.61%, and overall EBITDA 77.69 B. Within the capital structure of Eisai, their long-term debt to equity is 28.35 and long-term debt to total capital is 20.71. Finally, their profitability gross margin was 61.42 this past fiscal year.

== Clinical trials ==
To date there have been seven Phase I and Phase II clinical trials; four Phase I trials and three Phase II trials. The first Phase I clinical trial "A Study of the Safety, Tolerability, and Pharmacokinetics of MORAb-009, a Chimeric Monoclonal Antibody, in Subjects with Advanced Mesothelin-expressing Tumors" started in May 2006 with 24 enrolled participants and concluded in September 2008. No results have been posted. One of the early Phase I trials "A Single-Dose Pilot Study of Radiolabeled Amatuximab (MORAb-009) in Mesothelin Over Expressing Cancers" started in July 2013 with seven enrolled participants and was terminated early in November 2013. This clinical trial was the only trial not sponsored by Morphotek or Eisai but by the National Cancer Institute (NCI). However, Morphotek had just completed a similar Phase I trial just prior in March 2013. The results of this study have not been posted. Two of the Phase II trials are complete. "A Phase II Randomized, Placebo-controlled, Double-blind Study of the Efficacy of MORAb-099 in Combination with Gemcitabine in Patients with Advanced Pancreatic Cancer" was completed in 2009 and has posted results. The study enrolled 155 participants and no participants in either the experimental or placebo group completed the trial due primarily to lack of efficacy. Further, the results examined prior to the dis-enrollment of participants concluded that the median primary outcomes measure, overall survival measured in months from the time of randomization, did not increase in the MORAb-099 plus gemcitabine group compared to the placebo plus gemcitabine group. The final Phase II trial "A Randomized, Double-blind, Placebo-controlled Study of the Safety and Efficacy of Amatuximab in Combination with Pemetrexed and Cisplatin in Subjects with Unresectable Malignant Pleural Mesothelioma" was started in November 2015 with 108 enrolled participants and is estimated to be completed in September 2018. No Phase III trials have been started.
