= Amflutizole =

Chemical compound

Clinical data
- ATC code: none

Identifiers
- IUPAC name: 4-Amino-3-[3-(trifluoromethyl)phenyl]-1,2-thiazole-5-carboxylic acid
- CAS Number: 82114-19-0
- PubChem CID: 54833
- ChemSpider: 49508
- UNII: 83N680M457
- KEGG: D02896
- ChEMBL: ChEMBL2106558
- CompTox Dashboard (EPA): DTXSID00868642

Chemical and physical data
- Formula: C_{11}H_{7}F_{3}N_{2}O_{2}S
- Molar mass: 288.24 g·mol^{−1}
- 3D model (JSmol): Interactive image
- SMILES: FC(F)(F)c1cccc(c1)c2nsc(c2N)C(=O)O
- InChI: InChI=1S/C11H7F3N2O2S/c12-11(13,14)6-3-1-2-5(4-6)8-7(15)9(10(17)18)19-16-8/h1-4H,15H2,(H,17,18); Key:KVMCEGAWQYTFKC-UHFFFAOYSA-N

Amflutizole is a xanthine oxidase inhibitor used for the treatment of gout.
