= Ufenamate =

Chemical compound

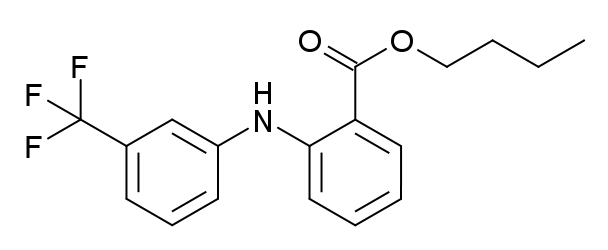

Clinical data
- AHFS/Drugs.com: International Drug Names
- Routes of administration: Topical
- ATC code: none

Legal status
- Legal status: In general: ℞ (Prescription only)

Identifiers
- IUPAC name: Butyl 2-([3-(trifluoromethyl)phenyl]amino)benzoate
- CAS Number: 67330-25-0
- PubChem CID: 5632
- ChemSpider: 5430
- UNII: 8Z7O7C1SLZ
- KEGG: D01823
- CompTox Dashboard (EPA): DTXSID30867269
- ECHA InfoCard: 100.127.465

Chemical and physical data
- Formula: C_{18}H_{18}F_{3}NO_{2}
- Molar mass: 337.342 g·mol^{−1}
- 3D model (JSmol): Interactive image
- SMILES: CCCCOC(=O)C1=CC=CC=C1NC2=CC=CC(=C2)C(F)(F)F
- InChI: InChI=1S/C18H18F3NO2/c1-2-3-11-24-17(23)15-9-4-5-10-16(15)22-14-8-6-7-13(12-14)18(19,20)21/h4-10,12,22H,2-3,11H2,1H3; Key:JDLSRXWHEBFHNC-UHFFFAOYSA-N

Ufenamate (INN) is a topical analgesic.
