= Audioanalgesia =

Relief of pain using white noise or music

- MeSH: D001297

Audioanalgesia (or audio-analgesia) is the relief of pain (analgesia) using white noise or music (that is, via audio equipment) without using pharmacological agents (that is, without analgesic drugs), usually during painful medical procedures such as dental treatments or some outpatient surgical procedures. It was first introduced by Gardner and Licklider in 1959 for the context of dental procedures.

There are many studies of this technique in dental, obstetric, and palliative care contexts. The most recent review reports mixed results for effectiveness, making audioanalgesia a questionable pain management strategy for painful procedures: it might prove useful in distraction and sensory confusion, but it is inadequate analgesia unless combined with pain relief medications. This makes it similar to breathing exercises during labor cramps before epidural administration of anesthetics. The theme is that something that is slightly helpful can be a valid adjunct but is not adequate for the given task when used alone, except perhaps in a minority of patients (eg, drug allergies, patient choice).

It has also been suggested that music may stimulate the production of endorphins and catecholamines.

Audioanalgesia self-evidently has some neurophysiologic analogies to stimming for relief of psychomotor agitation (especially auditory stimming) and in fact to any act of listening to white noise, calming sounds, or music for purposes of stress relief and relaxation. The full mapping of those analogies (including the identification of any common neural pathways shared by these analogues) awaits further development of neuroscience.

== See also ==
- Anesthesia
- Music therapy, another form of using auditory stimuli for therapeutic purposes
