= Amifloxacin =

Names
- Preferred IUPAC name 6-Fluoro-1-(methylamino)-7-(4-methylpiperazin-1-yl)-4-oxo-1,4-dihydroquinoline-3-carboxylic acid

Identifiers
CAS Number	86393-37-5
3D model (JSmol)	Interactive image
ChEMBL	ChEMBL6231
ChemSpider	50111
ECHA InfoCard	100.081.090
PubChem CID	55492
UNII	5TU5227KYQ
CompTox Dashboard (EPA)	DTXSID20235519
- InChI: InChI=1S/C16H19FN4O3/c1-18-21-9-11(16(23)24)15(22)10-7-12(17)14(8-13(10)21)20-5-3-19(2)4-6-20/h7-9,18H,3-6H2,1-2H3,(H,23,24) Key: RUXPNBWPIRDVTH-UHFFFAOYSA-N; InChI=1/C16H19FN4O3/c1-18-21-9-11(16(23)24)15(22)10-7-12(17)14(8-13(10)21)20-5-3-19(2)4-6-20/h7-9,18H,3-6H2,1-2H3,(H,23,24) Key: RUXPNBWPIRDVTH-UHFFFAOYAK
- SMILES: CNN1C=C(C(=O)O)C(=O)c2cc(F)c(cc12)N3CCN(C)CC3

Properties
Chemical formula	C_{16}H_{19}FN_{4}O_{3}
Molar mass	334.3 g/mol
- Except where otherwise noted, data are given for materials in their standard state (at 25 °C [77 °F], 100 kPa). verify (what is ?) Infobox references

Amifloxacin is a fluoroquinolone antibiotic, which is similar in its activity to ciprofloxacin.
