= Pain in babies =

Distress in human infants

Pain in babies, and whether babies feel pain, has been a subject of debate within the medical profession for centuries. Prior to the late nineteenth century it was generally considered that babies hurt more easily than adults. Into the 1980s, it was widely believed by medical professionals that babies could not feel pain, with medical procedures such as surgeries being regularly performed without anesthesia. It was only in the last quarter of the 20th century that scientific techniques finally established babies definitely do experience pain – probably more than adults – and developed reliable means of assessing and of treating it.

== Effects ==
There are a number of metabolic and homeostatic changes which result from untreated pain, including an increased requirement for oxygen, accompanied by a reduction in the efficiency of gas exchange in the lungs. This combination can lead to inadequate oxygen supply, resulting in potential hypoxemia. In addition, a rise in stomach acidity accompanies the stress reaction precipitated by pain, and there is a risk of aspirating this into the lungs, further endangering lung integrity and tissue oxygenation. In cases of acute, persistent pain, the metabolism becomes predominantly catabolic, causing reduced efficiency of the immune system and a breakdown of proteins caused by the action of the stress hormones. In combination, healing of damaged or infected tissue may be impaired, and morbidity and mortality increased.

The neuropsychological effect on the bonding between mother and child, on later contact with health professionals, and on personal and social psychological well-being is difficult to quantify. Research suggests that babies exposed to pain in the neonatal period have more difficulty in these areas. Professionals working in the field of neonatal pain have speculated that adolescent aggression and self-destructive behaviour, including suicide, may, in some cases, be attributed to the long-term effects of untreated neonatal pain.

== Pathophysiology ==
The present understanding of pain in babies is largely due to the recognition that the fetal and newborn unmyelinated nerve fibres are capable of relaying information, albeit slower than would be the case with myelinated fibres. At birth a baby has developed the neural pathways for nociception and for experiencing pain, but the pain responses are an immature version of that of an adult. There are a number of differences in both nerve structure and in the quality and extent of nerve response which are considered to be pertinent to understanding neonatal pain.

The nerves of young babies respond more readily to noxious stimuli, with a lower threshold to stimulation, than those of adults. A baby's threshold for sensitization is also substantially decreased, whilst the process involves a much larger area of sensitization with each trauma. The neural pathways that descend from the brain to the spinal cord are not well developed in the newborn, resulting in the ability of the central nervous system to inhibit nociception being more limited than in the adult.

There are also indication that the neonate's nervous system may be much more active than that of an adult, in terms of transforming its connections and central nerve pathways in response to stimuli. The ongoing process of neural pathway development, involving both structural and chemical changes of the nervous system, have been shown to be affected by pain events, both in the short term and potentially into adult life.

== Diagnosis ==
Some of the signs of pain in babies are obvious, requiring no special equipment or training. The baby is crying and irritable when awake, develops a disturbed sleep pattern, feeds poorly, and shows a fearful, distrustful reaction towards caregivers.

The classical International Association for the Study of Pain definition of pain as a subjective, emotional experience that is described in terms of tissue damage, depends on the patient being able to self-report pain, which is little use in diagnosing and treating pain in babies. More significant are non-verbal responses, of which there are two kinds: gross physical movements and physiological response measurements. The former are simple direct observation, while the latter requires specific equipment to monitor blood pressure and stress hormone levels.

The cry response is increasingly important, as researchers are now able to differentiate between different kinds of cry: classed as "hungry", "angry", and "fearful or in pain". Interpretation is difficult, however, depending on the sensitivity of the listener, and varies significantly between observers.

Studies have sought additional, visible and easily definable indicators of pain and in particular the high level of pain detected in babies when hungry, compared to pain levels in further developed children. Combinations of crying with facial expressions, posture and movements, aided by physiological measurements, have been tested and found to be reliable indicators. A number of such observational scales have been published and verified Even with noticeable responses from an infant, the underlying problem may be hidden. Due to the inability to speak or the side effects of the illness, it may be difficult to receive a proper diagnosis, causing infant diagnosis to be one of the hardest to do in the medical field.

An emerging method of measuring pain and stress in non-verbal infants is skin conductance measurement. Changes in skin conductance occur when the sympathetic nervous system is activated in response to pain and stress. The two major advantages of skin conductance measurement as an indicator of pain are its objectivity and the possibility of continuous monitoring.

=== Children and Infants' Postoperative Pain Scale ===
The Children and Infants Postoperative Pain Scale (ChIPPS) is often used in the assessment of hospitalised babies. The scale requires no special measurements, and is therefore applicable across a wide range of circumstances.

Described in 2000 by Buttner and Finke, the scale uses a measurement of five items, each rated as 0, 1, or 2 based on the following parameters:

Item	Score 0	Score 1	Score 2
Crying	None	Moaning	Screaming
Facial expression	Relaxed smiling	Wry mouth	Grimacing
Posture of the trunk	Neutral	Variable	Rear up
Posture of the legs	Neutral	Kicking	Tightened
Motor restlessness	None	Moderate	Restless

Total score indicates how the baby should be managed according to the scale:

- 0–3 No requirement for treating pain,
- 4–10 Progressively greater need for analgesia.

All observations, both movement and physiological, tend to decrease when pain is persistent, thus rendering the scale unreliable in acute or prolonged cases. In addition, hyperalgesia and allodynia, occur more quickly and more extensively in babies than in adults. Day to day changes in the response to a specific injury may therefore become unpredictable and variable.

== Treatment ==
Where the baby is to undergo some form of planned procedure, health professionals will take steps to reduce pain to a minimum, though in some circumstances it may be not be possible to remove all pain.

In case of illness, accident and post operative pain, a graded sequence of treatment is becoming established as standard practice. Research is making it easier and simpler to provide the necessary care, with a clearer understanding of the risks and possible side effects.

=== Measures not involving medication ===
==== Comforting ====
Touching, holding, stroking, keeping warm, talking and singing/music are ways in which adults have been comforting babies since the start of human history. This way of managing pain is shared with other primates, where the actions are performed both by female and male adults. Children who are able to verbalise pain report it to be an ineffective strategy and this is assumed to also be true of babies.

While the pain of a procedure may or may not be affected, the fear is visibly reduced. This works to ameliorate the negative effects of fear in health care situations. It is, therefore, considered good practice to involve parents or care-givers directly, having them present and in contact with the baby whenever possible before a minor painful procedure, such as the drawing of blood, or prior to giving a local anaesthetic injection.

==== Oral stimulation ====
Breastfeeding, the use of a pacifier and the administration of sugar orally has been proven to reduce the signs of pain in babies. Electroencephalographic changes are reduced by sugar, but the mechanism for this remains unknown; it does not seem to be endorphin mediated. As in comforting, it is unknown whether the physical pain is reduced, or whether it is the level of anxiety which is affected. However, the reduction in pain behaviour is assumed to be accompanied by a reduction in pain-related disorders, both immediate and longer term.

==== Oral sugar ====
Sugar taken orally reduces the total crying time but not the duration of the first cry in newborns undergoing a painful procedure (a single lancing of the heel). It does not moderate the effect of pain on heart rate and a recent single study found that sugar did not significantly affect pain-related electrical activity in the brains of newborns one second after the heel lance procedure. Sweet oral liquid moderately reduces the incidence and duration of crying caused by immunization injection in children between one and twelve months of age.

==== Sensorial saturation ====
Sensorial saturation follows a "3Ts" rule: using touch, taste and talk to distract the baby and antagonize pain. It is based on the competition of various gentle stimuli with pain transmission to the central nervous system: the so-called gate control theory of pain (proposed by Patrick David Wall and Ronald Melzack in 1965). In babies treated with sensorial saturation, a reduction in crying time and pain score were noted with respect to a control group and with respect to groups in which only oral sugar, only sucking, or a combination of the two was used. The "3Ts" stimuli (touch, talk, and taste) given throughout the painful procedure increase the well-known analgesic effect of oral sugar. Sensorial saturation has been included in several international guidelines for analgesia.

==== Other techniques ====
Other "old fashioned" techniques are being tested with some success. "Facilitated tucking", swaddling and "kangaroo care" have been shown to reduce the response of babies to painful or distressful circumstances, while a comprehensive technique of nursing, called "developmental care", has been developed for managing pre-term infants.

=== Measures involving medication ===
==== Local anaesthetics ====
A variety of topical anaesthetic creams have been developed, ranging from single agents with good skin penetration, to eutectic mixtures of agents and technologically modern formulations of lignocaine in microspheres. They are effective in suitable procedures, if correctly and timeously applied. Disadvantages are the slow onset of adequate anaesthesia, inadequate analgesia for larger procedures, and toxicity of absorbed medication.

Local infiltration anaesthesia, the infiltration of anaesthetic agent directly into the skin and subcutaneous tissue where the painful procedure is to be undertaken, may be effectively used to reduce pain after a procedure under general anaesthesia. To reduce the pain of the initial injection, a topical anaesthetic ointment may be applied.

Regional anaesthesia requires the injection of local anaesthetic around the nerve trunks that supply a limb, or into the epidural space surrounding the spinal cord. It is used for pain relief after surgery, but requires special facilities for observation of the baby until the effect has worn out.

==== Analgesics ====
As the site of pain in babies is difficult to confirm, analgesics are often advised against until a proper diagnosis has been performed. For all analgesic drugs, the immaturity of the baby's nervous system and metabolic pathways, the different way in which the drugs are distributed, and the reduced ability of the baby to excrete the drugs though the kidneys make the prescription of dosage important. The potentially harmful side effects of analgesic drugs are the same for babies as they are for adults and are both well known and manageable.

There are three forms of analgesia suitable for the treatment of pain in babies: paracetamol (acetaminophen), the nonsteroidal anti-inflammatory drugs, and the opioids. Paracetamol is safe and effective if given in the correct dosage. The same is true of the nonsteroidal anti-inflammatory drugs, such as ibuprofen (aspirin is seldom used). Of the opioids, morphine and fentanyl are most often used in a hospital setting, while codeine is effective for use at home. Clonidine is thought to have potential to reduce pain in newborn babies but it has yet to be tested in clinical trials.

== History ==
=== Pre late 19th century ===
Before the late nineteenth century, babies were considered to be more sensitive to pain than adults. Doris Cope quotes paediatric surgeon Felix Würtz of Basel, writing in 1656:

If a new skin in old people be tender, what is it you think in a newborn Babe? Doth a small thing pain you so much on a finger, how painful is it then to a Child, which is tormented all the body over, which hath but a tender new grown flesh?

=== Late 19th century ===
In the late nineteenth, and first half of the twentieth century, doctors were taught that babies did not experience pain, and were treating their young patients accordingly. From needle sticks to tonsillectomies to heart operations were done with no anaesthesia or analgesia, other than muscle relaxation for the surgery. The belief was that in babies the expression of pain was reflexive and, owing to the immaturity of the infant brain, the pain could not really matter.

Cope considers it probable that the belief arose from misinterpretation of discoveries made in the new science of embryology. Dr Paul Flechsig equated the non-myelinisation of much of a baby's nervous system with an inability to function.

It was generally believed that babies would not remember any pain that they happened to feel, and that lack of conscious memory meant lack of long-term harm. Scientific studies on animals with various brain lesions were interpreted as supporting the idea that the responses seen in babies were merely spinal reflexes. Furthermore, the whole effort of relieving pain was considered futile since it was thought to be impossible to measure the child's pain.

This, coupled with a concern that use of opiates would lead to addiction, and the time and effort needed to provide adequate analgesia to the newborn, contributed to the medical profession's continued practice of not providing pain relief for babies.

=== Mid-1980s ===
In the United States, a major change in practice was brought about by events surrounding one operation. Infant Jeffrey Lawson underwent open heart surgery in 1985. His mother, Jill R. Lawson, subsequently discovered that he had been operated on without any anaesthesia, other than a muscle relaxant. She started a vigorous awareness campaign which created such a public, and medical, reaction that by 1987 medical opinion had come full circle.

A number of studies on the measurement of pain in young children, and on ways of reducing the injury response began, and publications on the hormonal and metabolic responses of babies to pain stimuli began to appear, confirming that the provision of adequate anaesthesia and analgesia was better medicine on both humanitarian and physiological grounds.

It is now accepted that the neonate responds more extensively to pain than the adult does, and that exposure to severe pain, without adequate treatment, can have long-term consequences. Despite the difficulty of assessing how much pain a baby is experiencing, and the practical problem of prescribing the correct dosage or technique for treatment, modern medicine is firmly committed to improving the quality of pain relief for the very young.

The effective treatment of pain benefits the baby immediately, reduces some medium-term negative consequences, and likely prevents a number of adult psycho-physiological problems.

== See also ==
- Fetal pain
