= Adaptive enzyme =

An adaptive enzyme or inducible enzyme is an enzyme that is expressed only under conditions in which it is clearly of adaptive value, as opposed to a constitutive enzyme which is produced all the time.

The inducible enzyme is used for the breaking-down of things in the cell. It is also a part of the Operon Model, which illustrates a way for genes to turn "on" and "off". The inducer causes the gene to turn on (controlled by the amount of reactant which turns the gene on). Then there's the repressor protein that turns genes off. The inducer can remove this repressor, turning genes back on. The operator is a section of DNA where the repressor binds to shut off certain genes; the promoter is the section of DNA where the RNA polymerase binds. Lastly, the regulatory gene is the gene for the repressor protein. An example of inducible enzyme is COX-2 which is synthesized in macrophages to produce prostaglandin E_{2} while the constitutive enzyme COX-1 (another isozyme in COX family) is always produced in variety of organs in body (like stomach).
