= Amoscanate =

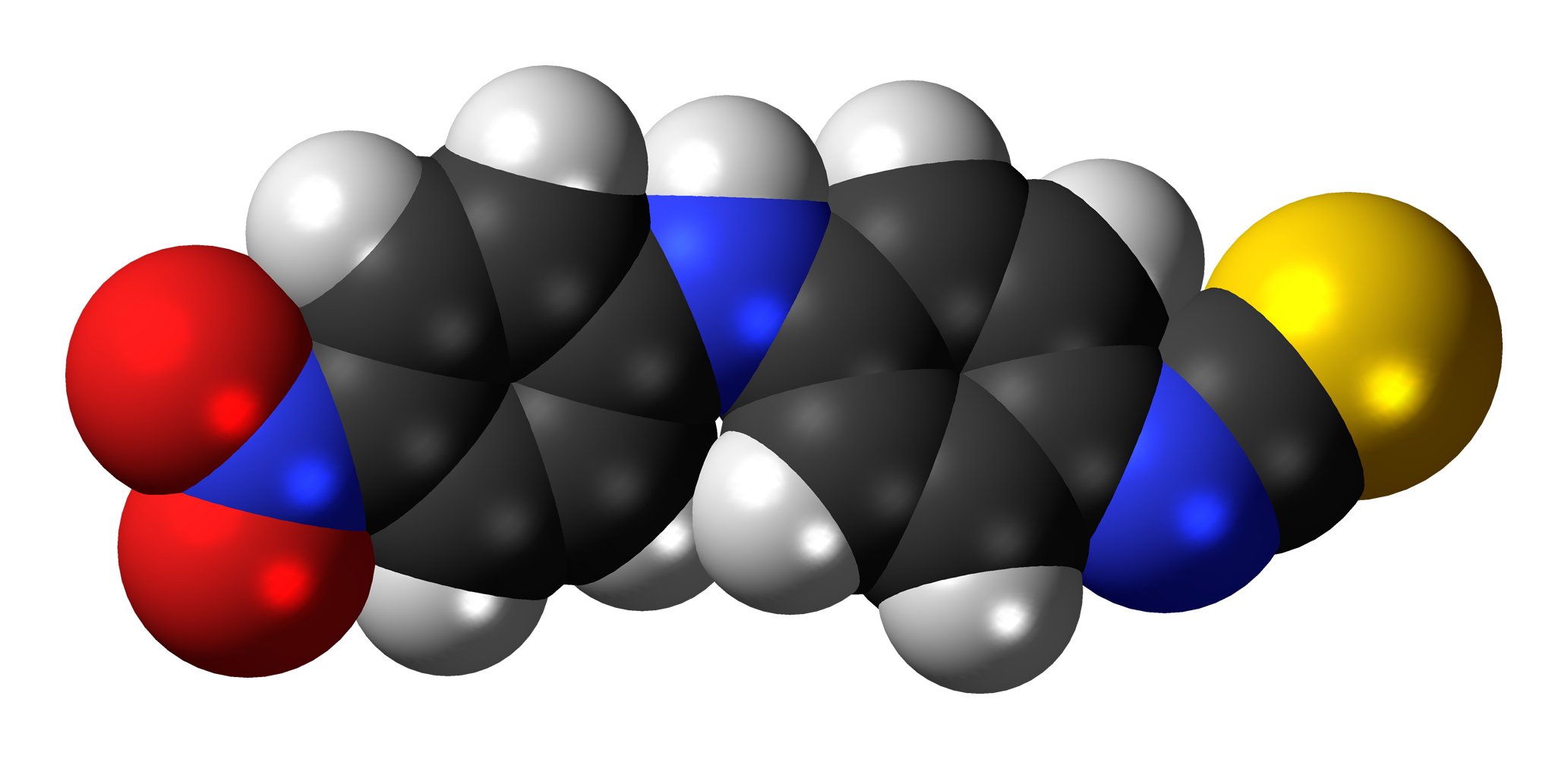

Names
- Preferred IUPAC name 4-Isothiocyanato-N-(4-nitrophenyl)aniline
- Other names 4-Isothiocyanato-4′-nitrodiphenylamine; Nithiocyamine

Identifiers
CAS Number	26328-53-0
3D model (JSmol)	Interactive image; Interactive image
ChEBI	CHEBI:38944
ChEMBL	ChEMBL93385
ChemSpider	30904
PubChem CID	33488
UNII	X0MK46CVRB
CompTox Dashboard (EPA)	DTXSID90180946
- InChI: InChI=1S/C13H9N3O2S/c17-16(18)13-7-5-12(6-8-13)15-11-3-1-10(2-4-11)14-9-19/h1-8,15H Key: DKVNAGXPRSYHLB-UHFFFAOYSA-N; InChI=1/C13H9N3O2S/c17-16(18)13-7-5-12(6-8-13)15-11-3-1-10(2-4-11)14-9-19/h1-8,15H
- SMILES: O=N(=O)c1ccc(Nc2ccc(cc2)N=C=S)cc1; [O-][N+](=O)c1ccc(cc1)Nc2ccc(N=C=S)cc2

Properties
Chemical formula	C_{13}H_{9}N_{3}O_{2}S
Molar mass	271.29 g·mol^{−1}
Melting point	204 to 206 °C (399 to 403 °F; 477 to 479 K)
- Except where otherwise noted, data are given for materials in their standard state (at 25 °C [77 °F], 100 kPa). verify (what is ?) Infobox references

Amoscanate (INN), also known as nithiocyamine, is an experimental anthelmintic agent of the aryl isothiocyanate class which was found to be highly effective in animals against the four major species of schistosomes which infect humans, and is also highly active against hookworm infection. However, significant liver toxicity was seen in lab animals at higher doses. The ether analogue of amoscanate, nitroscanate, is used in veterinary medicine as an anthelmintic.

Amoscanate was developed by Ciba.
