= Aminometradine =

Chemical compound

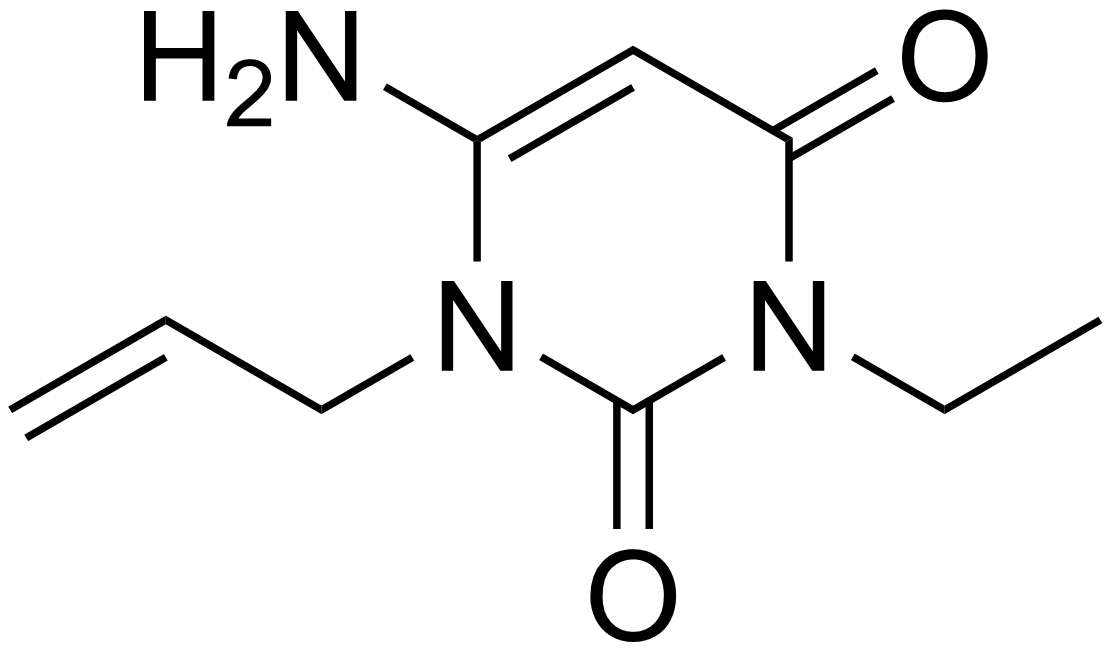

Clinical data
- ATC code: none

Identifiers
- IUPAC name: 6-Amino-3-ethyl-1-prop-2-enylpyrimidine-2,4-dione
- CAS Number: 642-44-4
- PubChem CID: 12551
- ChemSpider: 12033
- UNII: PPM8SX5Q3V
- CompTox Dashboard (EPA): DTXSID00214403
- ECHA InfoCard: 100.010.350

Chemical and physical data
- Formula: C_{9}H_{13}N_{3}O_{2}
- Molar mass: 195.222 g·mol^{−1}
- 3D model (JSmol): Interactive image
- SMILES: O=C1N(/C(=C\C(=O)N1CC)N)C\C=C
- InChI: InChI=1S/C9H13N3O2/c1-3-5-12-7(10)6-8(13)11(4-2)9(12)14/h3,6H,1,4-5,10H2,2H3; Key:NGXUUAFYUCOICP-UHFFFAOYSA-N

Aminometradine (sold as Mictine and Mincard, among others) is a weak diuretic which was used to control oedema in those who suffered mild congestive heart failure.

Alkyl uracil derivatives have been known for some time to act as diuretic agents in experimental animals. The toxicity of these agents precluded their use in the clinic. Appropriate modification of the molecule, did, however yield diuretic agents in man.
