= Glucametacin =

NSAID analgesic and anti-inflammatory drug

Clinical data
- Trade names: Teoremac
- Other names: Indometacin glucosamide

Identifiers
- IUPAC name: 2-[1-(4-Chlorobenzoyl)-5-methoxy-2-methylindol-3-yl]-N-[(2R,3R,4S,5R)-3,4,5,6-tetrahydroxy-1-oxohexan-2-yl]acetamide
- CAS Number: 52443-21-7
- PubChem CID: 3033980
- ChemSpider: 2298541
- UNII: N1EXE5EHAN
- KEGG: D08021
- ChEMBL: ChEMBL488914
- CompTox Dashboard (EPA): DTXSID80200445
- ECHA InfoCard: 100.052.640

Chemical and physical data
- Formula: C_{25}H_{27}ClN_{2}O_{8}
- Molar mass: 518.95 g·mol^{−1}

Glucametacin is a non-steroidal anti-inflammatory drug used for the treatment of mild or moderate pain associated with rheumatoid arthritis, osteoarthritis, and other rheumatological disorders. It has analgesic and anti-inflammatory effects.

Glucametacin is an amide of indometacin with glucosamine.
