= Ciclopramine =

Tetracyclic antidepressant

Clinical data
- ATC code: None

Legal status
- Legal status: Not marketed

Identifiers
- IUPAC name: N-Methyl-2,3,7,8-tetrahydro-1H-quino[1,8-ab][1]benzazepin-3-amine
- CAS Number: 33545-56-1
- PubChem CID: 160410
- ChemSpider: 140965
- UNII: BXS8X8APGS
- ChEMBL: ChEMBL2105933
- CompTox Dashboard (EPA): DTXSID40865675

Chemical and physical data
- Formula: C_{18}H_{20}N_{2}
- Molar mass: 264.372 g·mol^{−1}
- 3D model (JSmol): Interactive image
- SMILES: c14c2c(ccc1)C(NC)CCN2c3ccccc3CC4

Ciclopramine is a tetracyclic antidepressant (TeCA) that was never marketed.
