= Amebucort =

Chemical compound

Clinical data
- Other names: ZK-90999; 11β,17α,21-Trihydroxy-6α-methylpregn-4-ene-3,20-dione 17-butyrate 21-acetate
- Drug class: Corticosteroid; Glucocorticoid

Identifiers
- IUPAC name: [(6S,8S,9S,10R,11S,13S,14S,17R)-17-(2-Acetyloxyacetyl)-11-hydroxy-6,10,13-trimethyl-3-oxo-2,6,7,8,9,11,12,14,15,16-decahydro-1H-cyclopenta[a]phenanthren-17-yl] butanoate
- CAS Number: 83625-35-8
- PubChem CID: 3086167
- ChemSpider: 2342857
- UNII: 7YRF8G0G0F
- ChEMBL: ChEMBL2104661
- CompTox Dashboard (EPA): DTXSID60232466

Chemical and physical data
- Formula: C_{28}H_{40}O_{7}
- Molar mass: 488.621 g·mol^{−1}
- 3D model (JSmol): Interactive image
- SMILES: CCCC(=O)O[C@@]1(CC[C@@H]2[C@@]1(C[C@@H]([C@H]3[C@H]2C[C@@H](C4=CC(=O)CC[C@]34C)C)O)C)C(=O)COC(=O)C
- InChI: InChI=1S/C28H40O7/c1-6-7-24(33)35-28(23(32)15-34-17(3)29)11-9-20-19-12-16(2)21-13-18(30)8-10-26(21,4)25(19)22(31)14-27(20,28)5/h13,16,19-20,22,25,31H,6-12,14-15H2,1-5H3/t16-,19-,20-,22-,25+,26-,27-,28-/m0/s1; Key:QRRVOCXLQYLNEC-PPJDWOAVSA-N

Amebucort (developmental code name ZK-90999) is a synthetic glucocorticoid corticosteroid which was never marketed.
