= Amcinafal =

Chemical compound

Clinical data
- Other names: Triamcinolone pentanonide; SQ-15102; 9α-Fluoro-11β,16α,17α,21-tetrahydroxypregna-1,4-diene-3,20-dione cyclic 16,17-acetal with 3-pentanone; 9α-Fluoro-11β,21-dihydroxy-16α,17α-(methyl)(phenyl)methylendioxypregna-1,4-dien-3,20-dione
- Drug class: Corticosteroid; Glucocorticoid

Identifiers
- IUPAC name: (4aS,4bR,5S,6aS,6bS,9aR,10aS,10bS)-8,8-Diethyl-4b-fluoro-6b-glycoloyl-5-hydroxy-4a,6a-dimethyl-4a,4b,5,6,6a,6b,9a,10,10a,10b,11,12-dodecahydro-2H-naphtho[2',1':4,5]indeno[1,2-d][1,3]dioxol-2-one
- CAS Number: 3924-70-7
- PubChem CID: 10389615
- ChemSpider: 8565057
- UNII: 68LRV63XNE
- KEGG: D02886
- ChEMBL: ChEMBL2105968
- ECHA InfoCard: 100.021.362

Chemical and physical data
- Formula: C_{26}H_{35}FO_{6}
- Molar mass: 462.558 g·mol^{−1}
- 3D model (JSmol): Interactive image
- SMILES: CCC1(O[C@@H]2C[C@H]3[C@@H]4CCC5=CC(=O)C=C[C@@]5([C@]4([C@H](C[C@@]3([C@@]2(O1)C(=O)CO)C)O)F)C)CC
- InChI: InChI=1S/C26H35FO6/c1-5-24(6-2)32-21-12-18-17-8-7-15-11-16(29)9-10-22(15,3)25(17,27)19(30)13-23(18,4)26(21,33-24)20(31)14-28/h9-11,17-19,21,28,30H,5-8,12-14H2,1-4H3/t17-,18-,19-,21+,22-,23-,25-,26+/m0/s1; Key:NSZFBGIRFCHKOE-LFZVSNMSSA-N

Amcinafal (developmental code name SQ-15102), also known as triamcinolone pentanonide, is a synthetic glucocorticoid corticosteroid which was never marketed.
