= Ameltolide =

Chemical compound

Clinical data
- ATC code: None

Identifiers
- IUPAC name: 4-Amino-N-(2,6-dimethylphenyl)benzamide
- CAS Number: 787-93-9
- PubChem CID: 13086
- ChemSpider: 12541
- UNII: F83240ZOVE
- CompTox Dashboard (EPA): DTXSID7052860

Chemical and physical data
- Formula: C_{15}H_{16}N_{2}O
- Molar mass: 240.306 g·mol^{−1}
- 3D model (JSmol): Interactive image
- SMILES: O=C(Nc1c(cccc1C)C)c2ccc(N)cc2
- InChI: InChI=1S/C15H16N2O/c1-10-4-3-5-11(2)14(10)17-15(18)12-6-8-13(16)9-7-12/h3-9H,16H2,1-2H3,(H,17,18); Key:HZIWGOAXOBPQGY-UHFFFAOYSA-N

Ameltolide, a 4-aminobenzamide derivative, is an experimental anticonvulsant agent, effective at inhibiting seizures in animal models. It is non-toxic at dosing levels and no undesirable side effects are attributable to its application.
