= Tolmetin =

NSAID analgesic medication

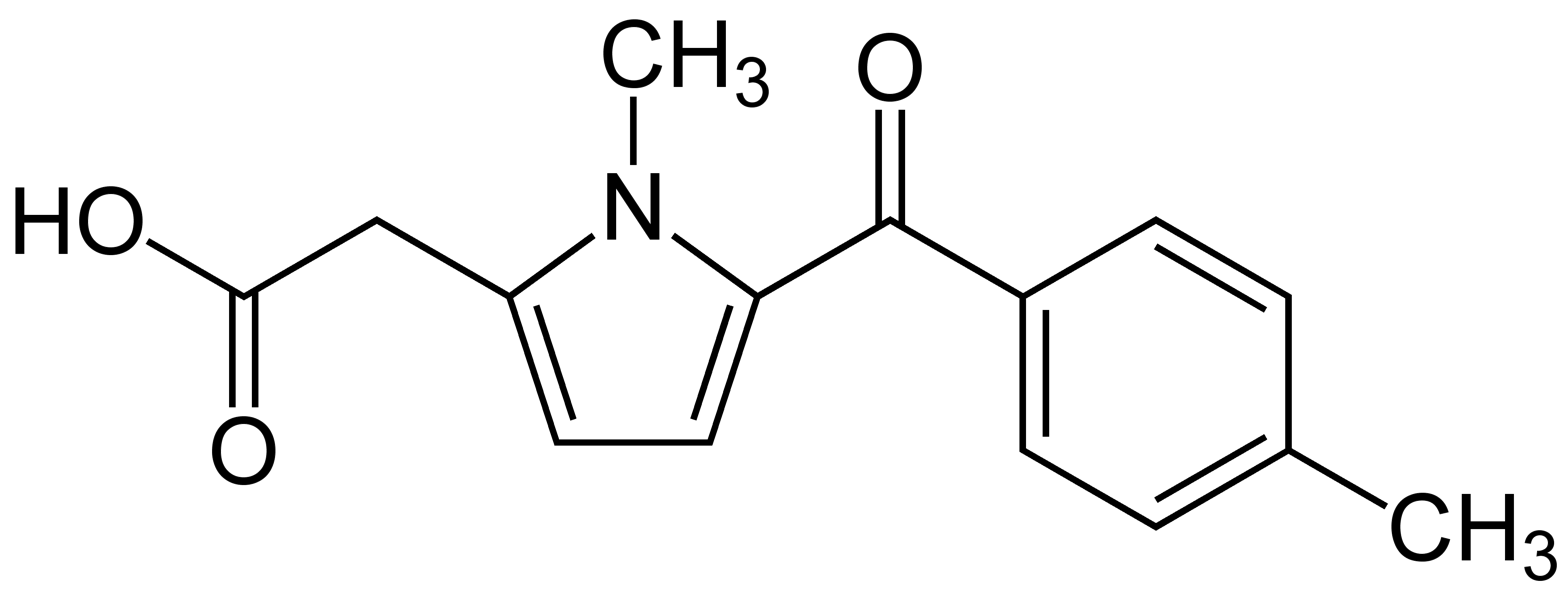

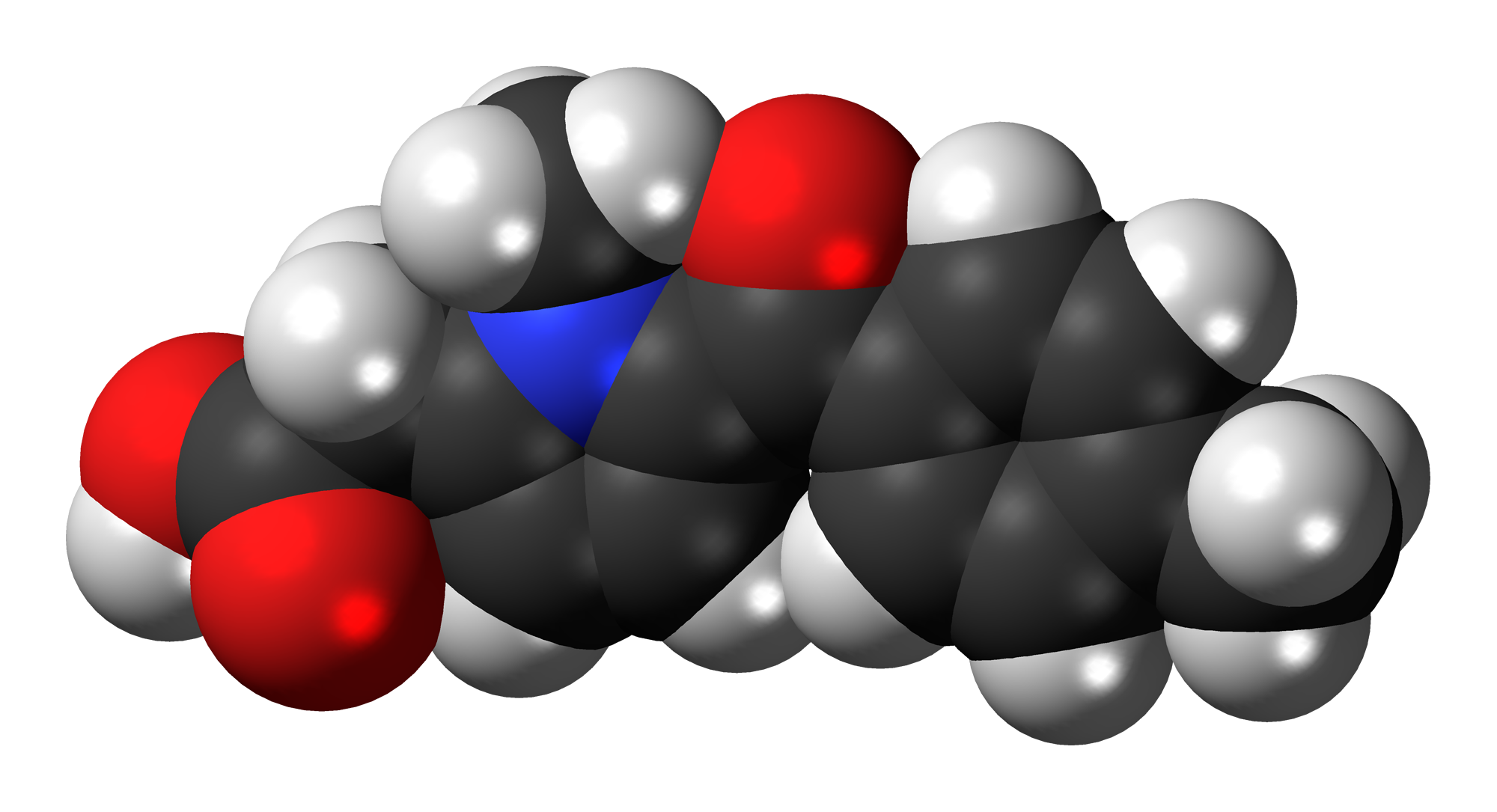

Clinical data
- Trade names: Tolectin
- AHFS/Drugs.com: Monograph
- MedlinePlus: a681033
- Routes of administration: By mouth
- ATC code: M01AB03 (WHO) M02AA21 (WHO)

Legal status
- Legal status: AU: S4 (Prescription only)

Pharmacokinetic data
- Elimination half-life: 1-2 hours, next phase up to 5 hours

Identifiers
- IUPAC name: [1-methyl-5-(4-methylbenzoyl)-1H-pyrrol-2-yl]acetic acid
- CAS Number: 26171-23-3
- PubChem CID: 5509
- IUPHAR/BPS: 7311
- DrugBank: DB00500
- ChemSpider: 5308
- UNII: D8K2JPN18B
- KEGG: D02355
- ChEBI: CHEBI:71941
- ChEMBL: ChEMBL1020
- CompTox Dashboard (EPA): DTXSID2043951
- ECHA InfoCard: 100.043.164

Chemical and physical data
- Formula: C_{15}H_{15}NO_{3}
- Molar mass: 257.289 g·mol^{−1}
- 3D model (JSmol): Interactive image
- SMILES: O=C(c1ccc(n1C)CC(=O)O)c2ccc(cc2)C
- InChI: InChI=1S/C15H15NO3/c1-10-3-5-11(6-4-10)15(19)13-8-7-12(16(13)2)9-14(17)18/h3-8H,9H2,1-2H3,(H,17,18); Key:UPSPUYADGBWSHF-UHFFFAOYSA-N

Tolmetin (/ˈtɒlmətɪn/) is a nonsteroidal anti-inflammatory drug (NSAID) of the heterocyclic acetic acid derivative class.

Tolmetin was originally approved by the US FDA in 1976. It is available internationally.

It is used primarily to reduce hormones that cause pain, swelling, tenderness, and stiffness in conditions such as osteoarthritis and rheumatoid arthritis, including juvenile rheumatoid arthritis. In the United States it was marketed as Tolectin and comes as a tablet or capsule.

== Clinical usage ==
Tolmetin is applicable in the treatment of rheumatoid arthritis, osteoarthrosis, pain, and ankylosing spondylitis.

== Mechanism of action ==
Although the mechanism of action of tolmetin is unknown, research involving humans and animals has shown that tolmetin does not achieve anti-inflammatory response by stimulation of the adrenal or pituitary gland, but it has shown tolmetin restrains prostaglandin synthetase in vitro and reduces plasma levels of prostaglandin E, possibly causing the anti-inflammatory response.

When tested in rats, tolmetin prevented experimentally stimulated polyarthritis and reduced inflammation. In patients with rheumatoid arthritis or osteoarthritis tolmetin was as effective as aspirin and indometacin, although the occurrence of mild gastrointestinal adverse effects and tinnitus was lower in patients treated with tolmetin than it was with aspirin-treated patients and the occurrence of adverse effects of the central nervous system was lower with tolmetin than it was with indomethacin.

== Side effects ==
Tolmetin can increase the risk of heart or circulatory conditions such as heart attacks and strokes. It should not be taken shortly before or after coronary artery bypass surgery. Tolmetin can also increase the risk of gastrointestinal conditions such as perforation or bleeding, which can be fatal. Antacids can be taken with tolmetin to relieve stomachaches that often occur. Overdose can result in drowsiness, nausea, epigastric pain, and vomiting.

In October 2020, the U.S. Food and Drug Administration (FDA) required the prescribing information to be updated for all nonsteroidal anti-inflammatory medications to describe the risk of kidney problems in unborn babies that result from low amniotic fluid. They recommend avoiding NSAIDs in pregnant women at 20 weeks or later in pregnancy.
