= Morniflumate =

Chemical compound

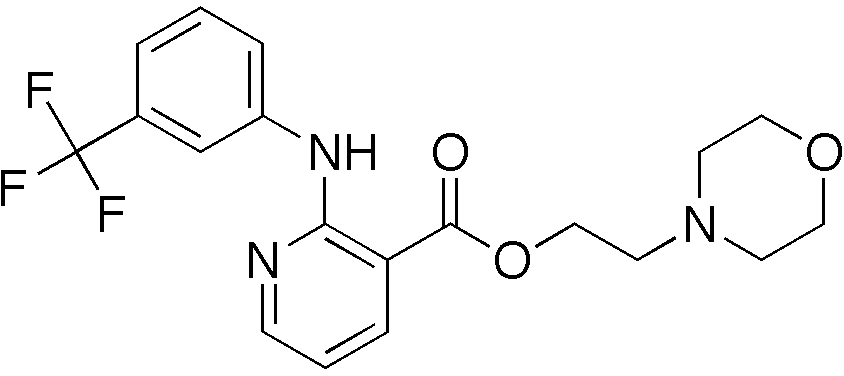

Clinical data
- AHFS/Drugs.com: International Drug Names
- ATC code: M01AX22 (WHO)

Identifiers
- IUPAC name: 2-morpholin-4-ylethyl 2-{[3-(trifluoromethyl)phenyl]amino}nicotinate
- CAS Number: 65847-85-0
- PubChem CID: 72106
- ChemSpider: 65089
- UNII: R133MWH7X1
- KEGG: D05078
- CompTox Dashboard (EPA): DTXSID6057798
- ECHA InfoCard: 100.207.566

Chemical and physical data
- Formula: C_{19}H_{20}F_{3}N_{3}O_{3}
- Molar mass: 395.382 g·mol^{−1}
- 3D model (JSmol): Interactive image
- SMILES: FC(F)(F)c1cc(ccc1)Nc2ncccc2C(=O)OCCN3CCOCC3
- InChI: InChI=1S/C19H20F3N3O3/c20-19(21,22)14-3-1-4-15(13-14)24-17-16(5-2-6-23-17)18(26)28-12-9-25-7-10-27-11-8-25/h1-6,13H,7-12H2,(H,23,24); Key:LDXSPUSKBDTEKA-UHFFFAOYSA-N

Morniflumate is a nonsteroidal anti-inflammatory drug (NSAID).
