= Amikhelline =

Chemical compound

Clinical data
- ATC code: none

Pharmacokinetic data
- Metabolism: none

Identifiers
- IUPAC name: 9-(2-diethylaminoethoxy)-4-hydroxy-7-methylpyrano[3,2-f][1]benzoxol-5-one
- CAS Number: 4439-67-2
- PubChem CID: 71198
- ChemSpider: 64334
- UNII: BD9T227F6M
- ChEMBL: ChEMBL2104025
- CompTox Dashboard (EPA): DTXSID20196151

Chemical and physical data
- Formula: C_{18}H_{21}NO_{5}
- Molar mass: 331.368 g·mol^{−1}
- 3D model (JSmol): Interactive image
- SMILES: O=C/1c3c(O\C(=C\1)C)c(OCCN(CC)CC)c2occc2c3O
- InChI: InChI=1S/C18H21NO5/c1-4-19(5-2)7-9-23-18-16-12(6-8-22-16)15(21)14-13(20)10-11(3)24-17(14)18/h6,8,10,21H,4-5,7,9H2,1-3H3; Key:QZBPFSZZMYTRIA-UHFFFAOYSA-N

Amikhelline is an antimitotic drug. It acts as a DNA intercalator and inhibits DNA polymerase.
