= Amidephrine =

Chemical compound

Clinical data
- Trade names: Dricol, Fentrinol, Nalde
- Other names: Amidefrine; MJ-1996; MJ-5190; 3-Methylsulfonamidyl-β-hydroxy-N-methylphenethylamine; 3-Methylsulfonamidyl-β-hydroxy-N-methyl-β-phenylethylamine
- ATC code: None

Identifiers
- IUPAC name: (RS)-N-{3-[1-hydroxy-2-(methylamino)ethyl]phenyl}methanesulfonamide
- CAS Number: 37571-84-9 1421-68-7 (mesylate)
- PubChem CID: 15010
- IUPHAR/BPS: 514
- DrugBank: DB16623
- ChemSpider: 14288
- UNII: 7E2P22546V
- ChEMBL: ChEMBL146408
- CompTox Dashboard (EPA): DTXSID40862664

Chemical and physical data
- Formula: C_{10}H_{16}N_{2}O_{3}S
- Molar mass: 244.31 g·mol^{−1}
- 3D model (JSmol): Interactive image
- SMILES: O=S(=O)(Nc1cc(ccc1)C(O)CNC)C
- InChI: InChI=1S/C10H16N2O3S/c1-11-7-10(13)8-4-3-5-9(6-8)12-16(2,14)15/h3-6,10-13H,7H2,1-2H3; Key:ZHOWHMXTJFZXRB-UHFFFAOYSA-N

Amidephrine (BAN), or amidefrine, sold under the brand name Fentrinol among others, is a selective α_{1}-adrenergic receptor agonist which is described as an adrenergic or sympathomimetic, vasoconstrictor, and topical nasal decongestant used to treat allergic rhinitis. It is used as the mesylate salt, which has the generic names amidefrine mesilate (INN) and amidephrine mesylate (USAN). The drug is a substituted phenethylamine derivative and is also known as 3-methylsulfonamidyl-β-hydroxy-N-methylphenethylamine. As of 2000, it remained marketed only in Austria.
