= Amelometasone =

Chemical compound

Clinical data
- Other names: TS-410; 21-O-Methyl-17-O-propionylbetamethasone; Betamethasone 17-propionate 21-methoxide; 9α-Fluoro-11β,17α-dihydroxy-21-methoxy-16β-methylpregna-1,4-diene-3,20-dione 17-propionate
- Drug class: Corticosteroid; Glucocorticoid

Identifiers
- IUPAC name: [(8S,9R,10S,11S,13S,14S,16S,17R)-9-Fluoro-11-hydroxy-17-(2-methoxyacetyl)-10,13,16-trimethyl-3-oxo-6,7,8,11,12,14,15,16-octahydrocyclopenta[a]phenanthren-17-yl] propanoate
- CAS Number: 123013-22-9
- PubChem CID: 443880
- ChemSpider: 391968
- UNII: T01B0RCE7T
- KEGG: D01156
- ChEBI: CHEBI:31200
- CompTox Dashboard (EPA): DTXSID4057631

Chemical and physical data
- Formula: C_{26}H_{35}FO_{6}
- Molar mass: 462.558 g·mol^{−1}
- 3D model (JSmol): Interactive image
- SMILES: CCC(=O)O[C@@]1([C@H](C[C@@H]2[C@@]1(C[C@@H]([C@]3([C@H]2CCC4=CC(=O)C=C[C@@]43C)F)O)C)C)C(=O)COC
- InChI: InChI=1S/C26H35FO6/c1-6-22(31)33-26(21(30)14-32-5)15(2)11-19-18-8-7-16-12-17(28)9-10-23(16,3)25(18,27)20(29)13-24(19,26)4/h9-10,12,15,18-20,29H,6-8,11,13-14H2,1-5H3/t15-,18-,19-,20-,23-,24-,25-,26-/m0/s1; Key:ZMYGOSBRLPSJNB-SOMXGXJRSA-N

Amelometasone (developmental code name TS-410) is a synthetic glucocorticoid corticosteroid which was never marketed.
