= Amezepine =

Chemical compound

Clinical data
- ATC code: None

Identifiers
- IUPAC name: N-methyl-2-(5-methyl-5H-dibenzo[b,f]azepin-10-yl)ethanamine
- CAS Number: 60575-32-8
- PubChem CID: 168912
- ChemSpider: 147747
- UNII: RZ5COP6XI5
- ChEMBL: ChEMBL2104017
- CompTox Dashboard (EPA): DTXSID20209376

Chemical and physical data
- Formula: C_{18}H_{20}N_{2}
- Molar mass: 264.372 g·mol^{−1}
- 3D model (JSmol): Interactive image
- SMILES: c3cc2c(\C=C(/c1c(cccc1)N2C)CCNC)cc3
- InChI: InChI=1S/C18H20N2/c1-19-12-11-14-13-15-7-3-5-9-17(15)20(2)18-10-6-4-8-16(14)18/h3-10,13,19H,11-12H2,1-2H3; Key:MHBXHCOUWYQAFZ-UHFFFAOYSA-N

Amezepine is a tricyclic antidepressant (TCA) which was never marketed.

== See also ==
- Tricyclic antidepressant
