= Philip Needleman =

American pharmacologist, academic and philanthropist. (1939–2024)

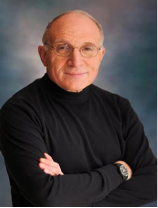
- Philip Needleman in 2011
- Born: February 10, 1939; Brooklyn, New York, U.S.
- Died: March 25, 2024 (Aged 85); St. Louis, Missouri
- Known for: COX-2 ANF / Atriopeptin
- Spouse: Sima Kolman Needleman (m. 1959)
- Children: 2
- Awards: John Jacob Abel Award of the American Pharmacology Society (1974) Research Achievement Award of the American Heart Association (1988) NAS Award for the Industrial Application of Science (2005)

Academic background
- Education: University of the Sciences; University of Maryland School of Medicine
- Academic advisors: John C. Krantz, Jr.

Academic work
- Discipline: Biochemistry, cell and molecular biology, physiology, and chemistry
- Institutions: Washington University in St. Louis

Philip Needleman (February 10, 1939 – March 25, 2024) was an American medical researcher, pharmaceutical industry executive and leader and philanthropist.

Needleman was a professor in and Chairman of the Department of Pharmacology, Washington University School of Medicine in St Louis, as well as former chief scientist and head of R&D at Monsanto/Searle/Pharmacia. He was a member of the National Academy of Sciences and Institute of Medicine and served as interim president of the Donald Danforth Plant Science Center and interim CEO of the Saint Louis Science Center. He is credited with discovering the first angiotensin receptor antagonist (hypertension); discovering the first pass drug metabolism (nitroglycerin); discovering a new endocrine hormone system ANF (atriopeptin), a critical hormone that controls salt, water metabolism, blood pressure and cardiac performance (heart failure); and discovering the existence and critical role of COX-2 in inflammation and oncology. In the pharmaceutical industry, he discovered and developed widely used therapeutics in arthritis (COX-2 inhibitors: Celebrex®, Bextra®, Parecoxib), heart failure (Eplerenone), and oncology (Sutent®).

== Early life and education ==
Needleman was born in Brooklyn, the son of Jewish immigrants from Hungary, Louis Needleman and Lillian (née Seligman) Needleman, whose family came to the U.S. to escape pogroms in Belarus. He and his brothers attended kindergarten through eighth grade in a Yeshiva in Jersey City and moved to North Bergen in 1948. Needleman started his public education in Horace Mann Junior High and graduated from Weehawken High School. Needleman received his Bachelor of Science degree in pharmacy in 1960 and his Master of Science in pharmacology in 1962 from the University of the Sciences. He completed his Ph.D. in Pharmacology at the University of Maryland School of Medicine in 1964. Immediately thereafter, he joined Washington University School of Medicine as a postdoctoral fellow in the Department of Pharmacology, working with Ed Hunter, Ph.D., and Oliver H. Lowry, M.D., Ph.D.

== Career ==
=== Academic career ===
Needleman has a long and distinguished scientific career that encompasses both academic research as well as pharmaceutical drug development. He was a postdoctoral fellow at the Washington University School of Medicine in 1964 and later joined the faculty of the Department of Pharmacology as a full professor in 1967. He served as head of the pharmacology department from 1976-89. Widely recognized for his research on hypertension, he and his colleagues discovered the first angiotensin antagonist and atrial natriuretic factor, the hormone that allows the heart to communicate with the kidneys to modulate salt and water metabolism and blood pressure.

=== Industry career ===
Needleman left academia for industry in 1989. Ready for a new challenge, he joined Monsanto as vice president and chief scientist. He was interested in taking problems all the way from discovery to clinical trials and then, hopefully useful therapeutics. Both the medical school and Monsanto agreed that he could keep his lab and continue his basic research, which enabled his family to stay in St. Louis and still be loosely attached to WashU. After joining Monsanto, Dr. Needleman was able to connect his earlier lab discovery of COX-2, a variation of the cyclooxygenase enzyme responsible for inflammation and pain in arthritis patients. In 1993 he became president of Searle. There, he oversaw research into COX-2 that led to the development of the anti-inflammatory drug celecoxib (Celebrex). Approved by the FDA in 1998, the blockbuster anti-inflammatory drug has been used by millions of Americans. He then served as senior executive vice president and chief scientist of Pharmacia from 2000 to 2003 after Monsanto merged with Pharmacia & Upjohn.

He remained closely tied to the university during this time, serving on the Board of Trustees beginning in 2002 and the Barnes-Jewish Hospital board. Needleman briefly returned to the School of Medicine in 2004, when he was named associate dean and assisted with BioMed 21, the university’s innovative research initiative designed to speed scientific discovery and to rapidly apply breakthroughs to patient care. He later served as interim president of two institutions, the Donald Danforth Plant Science Center (2009) and the Saint Louis Science Center (2011).

Dr. Needleman briefly served on the board of Infinity Pharmaceuticals, Inc, a privately held company which he left when it was merged with Discovery Partners in 2006. He also formerly served as a director of NIDUS Partners in St. Louis and as a scientific partner with Prospect Venture Partners in San Francisco.

== Awards and honors ==
Needleman was elected to the National Academy of Sciences in 1987 in the physiology and pharmacology section and to the academy's Institute of Medicine in 1993. He received the NAS Award for the Industrial Application of Science in 2005 for his work on "metabolism of arachidonic acid in physiology and pathophysiology, which generates prostacyclin and thromboxane." In 1994, Dr. Needleman was awarded an honorary doctorate in science from the Philadelphia College of Pharmacy and Science. He is a five-time recipient of Washington University's Distinguished Faculty Award on Founders Day and has also received the Second Century Award (1994) and an honorary doctorate in science (1999). Philip and Sima Needleman received the Eliot Search Award in 2011 and the Robert S. Brookings Award in 2019.

Needleman received numerous honors and awards including the John Jacob Abel Award of the American Pharmacology Society (1974), Research Achievement Award from the American Heart Association (1988), C. Chester Stock Award Lectureship at Memorial-Sloan Kettering Cancer Center (2001), and the Industrial Research Institute Medal (2001). In 2002, he was appointed special advisor to the president for Research and Development at Ben-Gurion University of the Negev and had joined the university's advisory committee for the creation of a National Institute for Biotechnology in the Negev. In 2004, he received the Pharmacia-ASPET Award in Experimental Therapeutics and the Donald Danforth Plant Science Center Distinguished Service Award in 2011. He was later named a fellow of the American Academy of Arts and Sciences in 2015.

== Philanthropy ==
Needleman attributed his generosity to his desire to leave the world a better place, which served as his motivation to get into science. He and his wife Sima supported causes they felt would have the greatest impact, primarily through science. During the last several years, he was the architect and funder of three centers at Washington University School of Medicine in St. Louis.

The Philip and Sima Needleman Center for Autophagy Therapeutics and Research and the Philip and Sima Needleman Center for Neurometabolic and Axonal Therapeutics were established in 2019 when Philip and Sima committed $15 million to two newly created centers at Washington University School of Medicine. The centers are dedicated to advancing promising areas of research into chronic diseases of aging. The Needlemans donated $15 million in 2023 to launch the Needleman Program in Innovation and Commercialization. The program aims to advance promising drug development into early clinical trials and help the university attract and retain exceptional faculty.

Dr. Needleman had a long friendship with Dr. William Danforth, the founder of the Donald Danforth Plant Science Center. He was a long-serving member of the Danforth Center board and had served as the Center’s interim president for over a year. In addition, to their annual giving, Philip and Sima Needleman made a significant gift in honor of Bill Danforth’s 90th birthday in 2016 and made the founding gift for the Center’s new Subterranean Influences on Nitrogen and Carbon (SINC) Center of Excellence in 2021. The SINC Center aims to develop technologies to decrease the use of nitrogen fertilizer, a major contributor to greenhouse gas emissions.

Needleman was also a supporter of several other notable institutions. Over the years, Needleman was a major supporter to the National Academy of Sciences, National Academy of Engineering Fund, National Academy of Medicine, and the Ben-Gurion University of the Negev, where he helped to create the National Institute for Biotechnology in the Negev, Israel. In 2016, Philip and Sima Needleman endowed the Philip and Sima K. Needleman Endowed Doctoral Fellowship in Plant Conservation Genetics to the Missouri Botanical Garden to support training of a St. Louis University doctoral student working in the field of plant conservation genetics. Dr. and Mrs. Philip Needleman generously have given to the Saint Louis Symphony Orchestra, sponsoring performances, as well as supported the Jewish Federation of St Louis and been major supporters of the Saint Louis Science Center and their Youth Exploring Science (YES) Program, which celebrated its 20th anniversary in 2019.

== Personal life ==
Needleman died on March 25, 2024 when a 100-foot tree came crashing down on him while he was walking in the woods with his dog. He was survived by his wife of 68 years, Sima Kolman Needleman, their two children, and their two grandchildren.
