= Mavacoxib =

Veterinary drug

Clinical data
- Trade names: Trocoxil
- AHFS/Drugs.com: International Drug Names
- ATCvet code: QM01AH92 (WHO)

Legal status
- Legal status: EU: Rx-only

Identifiers
- CAS Number: 170569-88-7
- PubChem CID: 9843089
- ChemSpider: 8018804
- UNII: YFT7X7SR77
- ChEBI: CHEBI:76207
- CompTox Dashboard (EPA): DTXSID90168880
- ECHA InfoCard: 100.248.948

Chemical and physical data
- Formula: C_{16}H_{11}F_{4}N_{3}O_{2}S
- Molar mass: 385.34 g·mol^{−1}
- 3D model (JSmol): Interactive image
- SMILES: C1=CC(=CC=C1C2=CC(=NN2C3=CC=C(C=C3)S(=O)(=O)N)C(F)(F)F)F
- InChI: InChI=1S/C16H11F4N3O2S/c17-11-3-1-10(2-4-11)14-9-15(16(18,19)20)22-23(14)12-5-7-13(8-6-12)26(21,24)25/h1-9H,(H2,21,24,25); Key:TTZNQDOUNXBMJV-UHFFFAOYSA-N

Mavacoxib (trade name Trocoxil) is a veterinary drug used to treat pain and inflammation in dogs with degenerative joint disease. It acts as a COX-2 inhibitor.

Mavacoxib, along with several other COX-2 selective inhibitors, including celecoxib, valdecoxib, and parecoxib, were discovered by a team at the Searle division of Monsanto led by John Talley.
