= Benjamin Zipursky =

Canadian legal scholar

- Born: Benjamin Charles Zipursky; 1960 (age 65–66); Winnipeg, Manitoba, Canada

Academic background
- Education: Swarthmore College; University of Pittsburgh; New York University
- Thesis: Objectivity and Linguistic Practice (1987)
- Doctoral advisor: Joseph L. Camp Jr.

Academic work
- Discipline: Law
- Sub-discipline: Jurisprudence
- Institutions: Fordham University

Benjamin Charles Zipursky (born 1960) is a Canadian legal scholar and professor at Fordham Law in New York City. He has been interviewed by PBS Newshour, BBC, and The New York Times on the Vioxx wrongful death cases and other torts cases. As an author of the casebook Tort Law: Responsibilities and Redress (along with professors Leslie Kendrick, John C. P. Goldberg and Anthony Sebok), he is nationally recognized as a scholar on torts.

He is also a noted scholar in jurisprudence and legal philosophy, having introduced Civil Recourse Theory in the 1998 article Rights, Wrongs, and Recourse in the Law of Torts. Contrary to economic theorists, Zipursky argues that tort law is about legal wrongs and legal rights, not just about economic efficiency. Contrary to corrective justice theorists, he argues that private law is more about empowering individuals to seek redress for wrongs, and less about compensating for losses.

Since 1998, Zipursky, along with collaborator and co-author Goldberg, has published a book and numerous articles, essays, and book chapters on civil recourse theory. Civil recourse theory has generated several conferences and commentaries from judges and academics in the United States and abroad.

Zipursky has twice served as Associate Dean at Fordham University School of Law, where he currently holds the James H. Quinn '49 Chair in Legal Ethics. He has taught as a visiting professor at Columbia Law School, Harvard Law School, and Vanderbilt University School of Law. In addition to products liability law, tort law, and philosophical theory of private law, his scholarly work also addresses analytic legal philosophy, legal ethics, and constitutional theory.

He was born and raised in Winnipeg, Manitoba, Canada and grew up in Hamilton, Ontario, Canada. He received his Bachelor of Arts degree from Swarthmore College in 1982, his Doctor of Philosophy degree in philosophy from the University of Pittsburgh in 1987, and his Juris Doctor degree magna cum laude from New York University School of Law in 1991.
