= John Talley (chemist) =

American medicinal chemist

John J. Talley is an American medicinal chemist who was the lead chemist in the discovery of the COX-2 selective nonsteroidal anti-inflammatory drug celecoxib and a co-inventor of amprenavir, a protease inhibitor used to treat HIV infection.

He earned his BA at the University of Northern Iowa and his PhD in chemistry from the University of Minnesota. From 1979 to 1986 he worked at the General Electric R&D center in Schenectady, New York then joined the Searle division of Monsanto, where he led the team that discovered celecoxib, as well as other marketed COX-2 inhibitors valdecoxib, parecoxib, and mavacoxib, as well as amprenavir which licensed by Searle to Vertex Pharmaceuticals. In 2002 he was hired by Microbia to lead their antifungal drug discovery efforts. He left the company in 2008.
