= Axinelline A =

Names
- IUPAC name Ethyl (2S)-2-[(2,3-dihydroxybenzoyl)amino]-3-hydroxypropanoate

Identifiers
3D model (JSmol)	Interactive image
ChEBI	CHEBI:205835
ChEMBL	ChEMBL4472111
ChemSpider	34981160
PubChem CID	139588023
- InChI: InChI=1S/C12H15NO6/c1-2-19-12(18)8(6-14)13-11(17)7-4-3-5-9(15)10(7)16/h3-5,8,14-16H,2,6H2,1H3,(H,13,17)/t8-/m0/s1 Key: ZNAULGVROLOSBS-QMMMGPOBSA-N
- SMILES: CCOC(=O)[C@H](CO)NC(=O)C1=C(C(=CC=C1)O)O

Properties
Chemical formula	C_{12}H_{15}NO_{6}
Molar mass	269.253 g·mol^{−1}
- Except where otherwise noted, data are given for materials in their standard state (at 25 °C [77 °F], 100 kPa). Infobox references

Axinelline A is a COX-2 inhibitor with the molecular formula C_{12}H_{15}NO_{6} which is produced by the bacterium Streptomyces axinellae.
