= Scott Reuben =

American anesthesiologist (born 1958)

Scott S. Reuben
- Born: 1958 (age 67–68)
- Occupation: Anesthesiologist
- Status: Released in 2010
- Conviction: Pleaded guilty February 24, 2010
- Criminal charges: Health care fraud
- Penalty: Six months in federal prison, three years' supervised release, $5,000 fine, forfeiture of $50,000, $360,000 restitution

Scott S. Reuben (born 1958) is an American anesthesiologist who falsified data heralding the benefits of the Pfizer pain medication Celebrex while downplaying its negative side effects.

Reuben was Professor of Anesthesiology and Pain Medicine at Tufts University in Boston, Massachusetts and chief of acute pain at Baystate Medical Center in Springfield, Massachusetts from February 1991 until 2009 when he was sentenced to prison for healthcare fraud. Reuben was considered to be a prolific and influential researcher in pain management, and his purported findings altered the way millions of patients are treated for pain during and after orthopedic surgeries. Reuben has now admitted that he never conducted any of the clinical trials on which his conclusions were based "in what may be considered the longest-running and widest-ranging cases of academic fraud." Scientific American has called Reuben the medical equivalent of Bernie Madoff, the former NASDAQ chairman who was convicted of orchestrating a $65-billion Ponzi scheme.

== Background ==
Reuben was educated at Columbia University. He graduated from medical school at the State University of New York at Buffalo in 1985 and undertook his anesthesiology residency at Mount Sinai Medical Center in New York City.

Reuben fell under suspicion when Baystate conducted a routine audit in May 2008 which revealed that Reuben had not been given approval for two studies that he intended to present during the hospital's research week. On March 10, 2009 a Baystate spokeswoman announced that Reuben admitted to fabricating many of the data underlying his research. Reuben never conducted the clinical trials that he wrote about in 21 journal articles dating from at least 1996. In some cases, he even invented the patients. Although Reuben often co-wrote papers with other researchers, Baystate found that the other researchers did not know about or participate in Reuben's studies, and their names were forged on documents. The hospital asked the journals to retract the studies, which reported favorable results from painkillers including Pfizer Inc.'s Bextra, Celebrex and Lyrica and Merck & Co. Inc.'s Vioxx. His studies also claimed Wyeth's antidepressant Effexor could be used as a painkiller. Pfizer gave Reuben five research grants between 2002 and 2007. He was a paid member of the company's speakers bureau, giving talks about Pfizer drugs to colleagues. Reuben also wrote to the Food and Drug Administration, urging the agency not to restrict the use of many of the painkillers he studied, citing his own data on their safety and effectiveness.

"Doctors have been using (his) findings very widely," said Steven Shafer, editor of Anesthesia and Analgesia, a scientific journal that published ten articles identified as containing fraudulent data. "His findings had a huge impact on the field." He also described Reuben's actions as the biggest case of fraud in the history of anesthesiology. Fellow editor Paul White believed that Reuben's fraudulent studies may have actually harmed patients due to the sale of "billions of dollars' worth of drugs" that caused slower recovery times.

Reuben's work had actually come under scrutiny as early as 2007, when several anesthesiologists noticed his studies never showed negative results. Greg Koski, former director of the Office for Human Research Protections, said the fraud was unusual because Reuben was able to carry it on for almost 13 years without being caught by the peer review process.

All of Reuben's 21 fraudulent articles, as well as the article abstracts, are documented in the magazine Healthcare Ledger.

Tufts has since cut ties with Reuben, and his Massachusetts medical license was permanently revoked after a period in which he voluntarily agreed not to practice.

== Sentencing ==
On January 7, 2010 Reuben agreed to plead guilty to one count of health care fraud. Prosecutors alleged that Reuben obtained thousands of dollars in grants for research that he never performed. He formally pleaded guilty on February 21, 2010 before Judge Michael Ponsor. On May 24, Ponsor sentenced him to six months in prison, followed by three years of supervised release. He was ordered to pay a $5,000 fine, forfeit $50,000 to the government and make $360,000 in restitution to pharmaceutical companies. The plea deal effectively ended his career as a doctor; most states will not grant medical licenses to convicted felons.

On November 16, 2011 the U.S. Food and Drug Administration (FDA) issued an order permanently debarring Reuben from assisting in drug applications.

== Impact ==
A 2009 review of systematic review articles used in evidence-based medicine found that while some reviews were no longer valid when the Reuben studies were removed, the conclusions in the majority of them remained unchanged. The review found that the key Reuben claims that needed to be re-examined were "the absence of detrimental effects of coxibs on bone healing after spine surgery, the beneficial long-term outcome after preemptive administration of coxibs including an allegedly decreased incidence of chronic pain after surgery, and the analgesic efficacy of ketorolac or clonidine when added to local anesthetics for intravenous regional anesthesia."

In 2010 the editorial in Anaesthesia argued that,

Reuben's fabricated data may have had impact beyond systematic review conclusions because they addressed topical questions for which anaesthetists, surgeons, and patients seek answers, such as the utility of multimodal anaesthesia, or whether non-steroidal anti-inflammatory drugs (NSAIDs) influence bone healing ... Millions of people have had NSAIDs after fractures, trauma or orthopaedic surgery without problems of bone healing. The plausibility of a sizeable negative effect of NSAIDs on bone healing has to be questioned.

== See also ==
- List of scientific misconduct incidents
