= Karen Seibert =

American pharmacological scientist (c.1959–2020)

- Born: c. 1959; United States
- Died: November 9, 2020 (aged 61); United States
- Education: Northwestern University, University of Toledo, Vanderbilt University School of Medicine
- Known for: COX-2 inflammatory pathway, Celecoxib (Celebrex)
- Awards: Edgar Queeny Prize, Discoverer's Award, St. Louis Healthcare Hero
- Scientific career
- Fields: Pharmacology, Pain, Inflammation, Cancer Research
- Workplaces: Washington University School of Medicine, Monsanto Company, Pfizer

Karen Seibert (c.1959 – November 9, 2020) was an American pharmacological scientist, instrumental in the elaboration of the COX-2 inflammatory pathway and in the discovery of inhibitors of COX-2, such as celecoxib (Celebrex), used to relieve pain and treat arthritis. At the time of her death from cancer on 9 November 2020 aged 61, she was Professor of Anesthesiology, Pathology and Immunology, and Genetics, and Executive Director of the Center for Clinical Pharmacology in the Department of Physiology at Washington University School of Medicine in St. Louis MO.

== Education and professional career ==
Seibert received her undergraduate degree in biology from Northwestern University before she got her Master's of Science in pharmacology from the University of Toledo. In 1987, she earned her Ph.D. from Vanderbilt University School of Medicine. Following a postdoctoral research fellowship at Washington University, Siebert started a 20-year research career in the pharmaceutical industry, starting in 1991 at the Monsanto Company pharmaceutical division which became part of Pharmacia before becoming part of Pfizer, Inc. Seibert moved up the ranks to Vice President of Research at the Pfizer St. Louis research facility, supervising over 300 scientists in her line. In 2010, Seibert returned to Washington University as an academic, becoming Professor of Anesthesiology, Pathology and Immunology, and Genetics as well as the Executive Director of the Center for Clinical Pharmacology in the Department of Physiology, a formal collaboration between Washington University and St Louis College of Pharmacy. She also served as the Associate Director of Shared Resources for the Siteman Comprehensive Cancer Center.

== Scientific contributions ==
Siebert published scientific research across a wide span of disciplines, including pain, inflammation and cancer research, focusing on understanding the mechanisms for possible therapeutic interventions and diagnostics. Building off her doctoral and postdoctoral research efforts in elucidating the distinctions of COX-1 from COX 2, Seibert became one of the key scientists in developing the novel class of COX-2 specific inhibitors, a class of pain relievers and anti-inflammatories designed to avoid the intestinal issues associated with NSAIDS such as aspirin, which inhibit both COX-1 and COX-2. This work led to the discovery of the pain reliever celecoxib (marketed as Celebrex) for the treatment of pain and arthritis.

In her subsequent academic career at Washington University, Seibert published evidence for anticancer activity for celecoxib. She also developed and led the Genomics and Pathology Services (GPS) at WUSM, where genomic-based clinical tests were developed for use in the diagnosis and treatment of patients with cancer and other diseases.

== Awards and recognition ==
In 2000, the Monsanto Company recognized Seibert's important contributions to the discovery of celecoxib by awarding her the Edgar Queeny Prize for Excellence in Science and Technology. The pharmaceutical industry (PhRMA) recognized her research and discovery efforts with their Discoverer's Award in 2002. Her drug discovery research led to her selection as a "St. Louis Healthcare Hero" in 2008 and being awarded the Outstanding Scientific Leadership Award from the St Louis Academy of Science in 2013.

== Publications ==
Representative articles from nearly 100 peer reviewed publications:

1. The Role of Cyclooxygenase-2 in Inflammation. Masferrer JL, Zweifel BS, Colburn SM, Ornberg RL, Salvemini D, Isakson P, Seibert K. Am J Ther. 1995 Sep;2(9):607-610.
2. Valdecoxib: assessment of cyclooxygenase-2 potency and selectivity. Gierse JK, Zhang Y, Hood WF, Walker MC, Trigg JS, Maziasz TJ, Koboldt CM, Muhammad JL, Zweifel BS, Masferrer JL, Isakson PC, Seibert K.J Pharmacol Exp Ther. 2005 Mar;312(3):1206-12.
3. Mechanism of inhibition of novel COX-2 inhibitors. Gierse J, Kurumbail R, Walker M, Hood B, Monahan J, Pawlitz J, Stegeman R, Stevens A, Kiefer J, Koboldt C, Moreland K, Rowlinson S, Marnett L, Pierce J, Carter J, Talley J, Isakson P, Seibert K. Adv Exp Med Biol. 2002;507:365-9.
4. The novel benzopyran class of selective cyclooxygenase-2 inhibitors-part I: the first clinical candidate. Wang JL, Carter J, Kiefer JR, Kurumbail RG, Pawlitz JL, Brown D, Hartmann SJ, Graneto MJ, Seibert K, Talley J. J.Bioorg Med Chem Lett. 2010 Dec 1;20(23):7155-8.
5. Valdecoxib: assessment of cyclooxygenase-2 potency and selectivity. Gierse JK, Zhang Y, Hood WF, Walker MC, Trigg JS, Maziasz TJ, Koboldt CM, Muhammad JL, Zweifel BS, Masferrer JL, Isakson PC, Seibert K. J Pharmacol Exp Ther. 2005 Mar;312(3):1206-12. Epub 2004 Oct 19.
6. Validation of a next-generation sequencing assay for clinical molecular oncology. Cottrell CE, Al-Kateb H, Bredemeyer AJ, Duncavage EJ, Spencer DH, Abel HJ, Lockwood CM, Hagemann IS, O'Guin SM, Burcea LC, Sawyer CS, Oschwald DM, Stratman JL, Sher DA, Johnson MR, Brown JT, Cliften PF, George B, McIntosh LD, Shrivastava S, Nguyen TT, Payton JE, Watson MA, Crosby SD, Head RD, Mitra . RD, Nagarajan R, Kulkarni S, Seibert K, Virgin HW 4th, Milbrandt J, Pfeifer JD.J Mol Diagn. 2014 Jan;16(1):89-105.
7. Clinical next-generation sequencing in patients with non-small cell lung cancer. Hagemann IS, Devarakonda S, Lockwood CM, Spencer DH, Guebert K, Bredemeyer AJ, Al-Kateb H, Nguyen TT, Duncavage EJ, Cottrell CE, Kulkarni S, Nagarajan R, Seibert K, Baggstrom M, Waqar SN, Pfeifer JD, Morgensztern D, Govindan R.Cancer. 2015 Feb 15;121(4):631-9.
8. Clinical genomicist workstation. Sharma MK, Phillips J, Agarwal S, Wiggins WS, Shrivastava S, Koul SB, Bhattacharjee M, Houchins CD, Kalakota RR, George B, Meyer RR, Spencer DH, Lockwood CM, Nguyen TT, Duncavage EJ, Al-Kateb H, Cottrell CE, Godala S, Lokineni R, Sawant SM, Chatti V, Surampudi S, Sunkishala RR, Darbha R, Macharla S, Milbrandt JD, Virgin HW, Mitra RD, Head RD, Kulkarni S, Bredemeyer A, Pfeifer JD, Seibert K, Nagarajan R.AMIA Jt Summits Transl Sci Proc. 2013 Mar 18;2013:156-7. eCollection 2013.
