= Apricoxib =

Chemical compound

Legal status
- Legal status: Investigational

Identifiers
- IUPAC name: 4-[2-(4-Ethoxyphenyl)-4-methyl-1H-pyrrol-1-yl]benzenesulfonamide
- CAS Number: 197904-84-0
- PubChem CID: 9820073
- DrugBank: DB12378
- ChemSpider: 7995822
- UNII: 5X5HB3VZ3Z
- KEGG: D08657
- CompTox Dashboard (EPA): DTXSID60173502

Chemical and physical data
- Formula: C_{19}H_{20}N_{2}O_{3}S
- Molar mass: 356.44 g·mol^{−1}
- 3D model (JSmol): Interactive image
- SMILES: CCOC1=CC=C(C=C1)C2=CC(=CN2C3=CC=C(C=C3)S(=O)(=O)N)C
- InChI: InChI=1S/C19H20N2O3S/c1-3-24-17-8-4-15(5-9-17)19-12-14(2)13-21(19)16-6-10-18(11-7-16)25(20,22)23/h4-13H,3H2,1-2H3,(H2,20,22,23); Key:JTMITOKKUMVWRT-UHFFFAOYSA-N

Apricoxib is an experimental anticancer drug and nonsteroidal anti-inflammatory drug (NSAID). It is a COX-2 inhibitor which is intended to improve standard therapy response in molecularly defined models of pancreatic cancer. It was also studied in clinical trials for non-small-cell lung cancer. Development was abandoned in 2015 due to poor clinical trial results.
