= Streptomyces axinellae =

Scientific classification
- Domain: Bacteria
- Kingdom: Bacillati
- Phylum: Actinomycetota
- Class: Actinomycetes
- Order: Streptomycetales
- Family: Streptomycetaceae
- Genus: Streptomyces
- Species: S. axinellae

Binomial name
- Streptomyces axinellae Pimentel-Elardo et al. 2009

Type strain
- CIP 109838, DSM 41948, JCM 16373, Pol001

Species of bacterium

Streptomyces axinellae is a bacterium species from the genus of Streptomyces which has been isolated from the sponge Axinella polypoides in Banyuls-sur-Mer in France. Streptomyces axinellae produces axinelline A and tetromycin B.

== See also ==
- List of Streptomyces species
