= Parecoxib =

Type of nonsteroidal anti-inflammatory drug

Clinical data
- AHFS/Drugs.com: International Drug Names
- Pregnancy category: AU: C
- Routes of administration: Intravenous, intramuscular
- ATC code: M01AH04 (WHO)

Legal status
- Legal status: AU: S4 (Prescription only); BR: Class C1 (Other controlled substances); UK: POM (Prescription only); EU: Rx-only

Pharmacokinetic data
- Bioavailability: 100%
- Protein binding: 98%
- Metabolism: Liver to valdecoxib and propionic acid CYP extensively involved (mainly CYP3A4 and 2C9)
- Elimination half-life: 22 minutes (parecoxib); 8 hours (valdecoxib)
- Excretion: Kidney (70%, metabolites)

Identifiers
- IUPAC name: N-{[4-(5-methyl-3-phenylisoxazol-4-yl)phenyl] sulfonyl}propanamide
- CAS Number: 198470-84-7
- PubChem CID: 119828
- IUPHAR/BPS: 2895
- DrugBank: DB08439
- ChemSpider: 106990
- UNII: 9TUW81Y3CE
- ChEBI: CHEBI:73038
- ChEMBL: ChEMBL1206690
- CompTox Dashboard (EPA): DTXSID1044229
- ECHA InfoCard: 100.230.078

Chemical and physical data
- Formula: C_{19}H_{18}N_{2}O_{4}S
- Molar mass: 370.42 g·mol^{−1}
- 3D model (JSmol): Interactive image
- SMILES: O=C(NS(=O)(=O)c3ccc(c2c(onc2c1ccccc1)C)cc3)CC
- InChI: InChI=1S/C19H18N2O4S/c1-3-17(22)21-26(23,24)16-11-9-14(10-12-16)18-13(2)25-20-19(18)15-7-5-4-6-8-15/h4-12H,3H2,1-2H3,(H,21,22); Key:TZRHLKRLEZJVIJ-UHFFFAOYSA-N

Parecoxib, sold under the brand name Dynastat among others, is a water-soluble and injectable prodrug of valdecoxib. Parecoxib is a COX2 selective inhibitor. It is injectable. It is approved in the European Union for short term perioperative pain control.

It was patented in 1996 and approved for medical use in 2002.

== Approval ==
In 2005, the US Food and Drug Administration (FDA) issued a letter of non-approval for parecoxib in the United States. No reasons were ever documented publicly for the non-approval, although one study noted increased occurrences of heart attacks following cardiac bypass surgery compared to placebo when high doses of parecoxib were used to control pain after surgery. Importantly, rare but severe allergic reactions (Stevens–Johnson syndrome, Lyell syndrome) have been described with valdecoxib, the molecule to which parecoxib is converted. The drug is not approved for use after cardiac surgery in Europe.

All anti-inflammatory medications in the US carry the same warning regarding skin reactions, and none are approved for use during CABG surgery, so the reason for the FDA denying the approval of parecoxib remains unknown, but was likely related to political pressure from the US Congress to not approve another COX-2 selective inhibitor in the wake of the Vioxx affair. No COX-2 selective inhibitor has been approved in the US since that time, regardless of the safety profile of parecoxib in Europe. Efforts to find out the scientific rationale, or more likely the lack thereof, that the FDA used to justify the non-approval of parecoxib in the USA have proven futile due to secrecy issues.

The political motivation to not approve parecoxib was further supported by a 2017 pooled analysis of safety data in 28 published studies, which showed after 69,567,300 units of parecoxib, skin rash and cardiac complications were minimal, if at all, different from placebo.

Parecoxib, along with other COX-2 selective inhibitors, celecoxib, valdecoxib, and mavacoxib, were discovered by a team at the Searle division of Monsanto led by John Talley.

Parecoxib is the first parenteral COX-2 selective inhibitor available for clinical use in pain management. Its first perceptible analgesic effect occurs within seven to thirteen minutes, with clinically meaningful analgesia demonstrated within twenty-three to thirty-nine minutes and a peak effect within two hours following administration of single doses of 40 mg by IV or IM injection.
