= Celecoxib =

Nonsteroidal anti-inflammatory medication

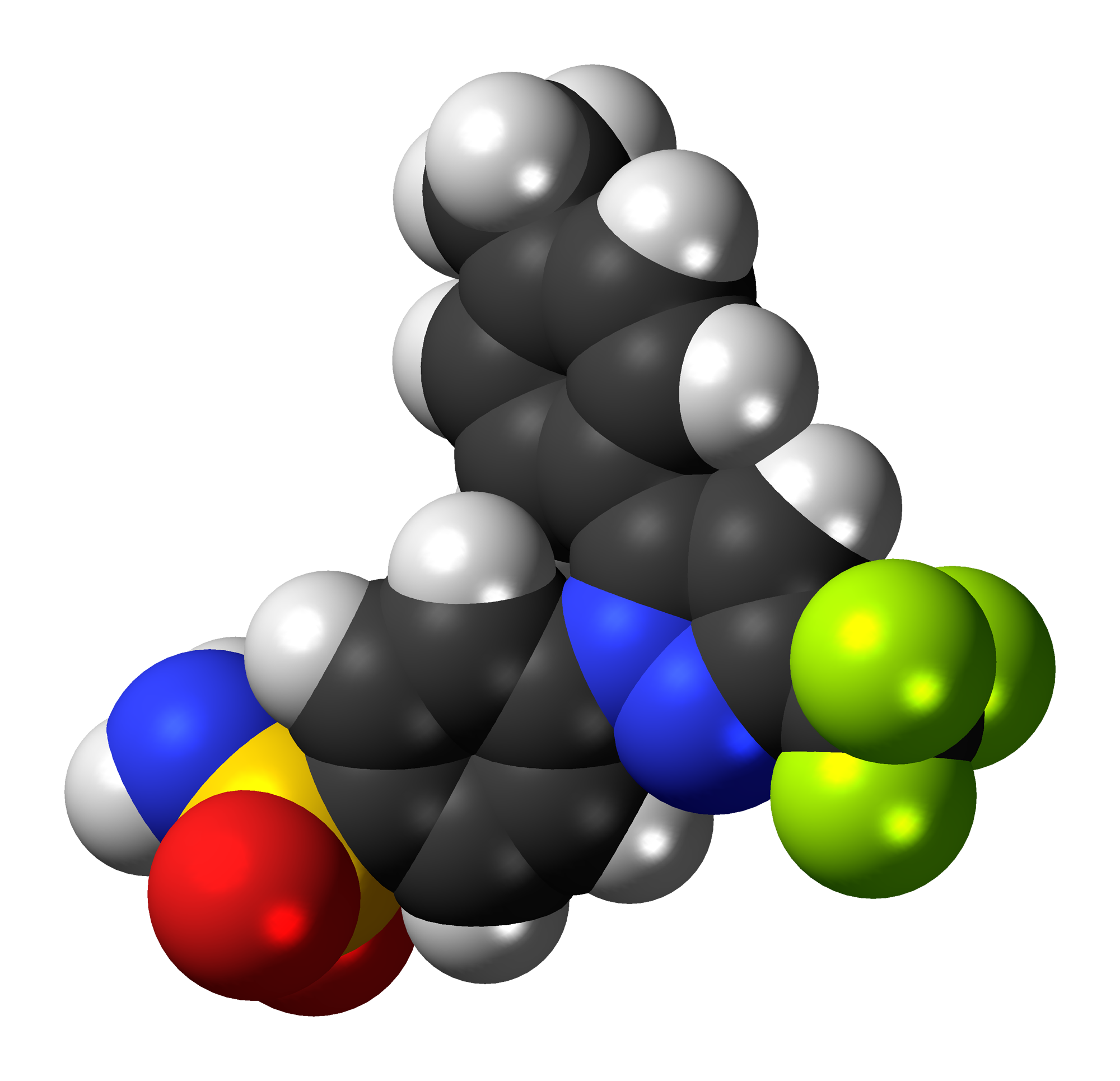

Clinical data
- Pronunciation: /sɛlɪˈkɒksɪb/ SEL-i-KOK-sib
- Trade names: Celebrex, Onsenal, Elyxyb, Celebra, others
- AHFS/Drugs.com: Monograph
- MedlinePlus: a699022
- License data: US DailyMed: Celecoxib
- Pregnancy category: AU: B3
- Routes of administration: By mouth
- Drug class: Cyclooxygenase-2 (COX-2) inhibitor
- ATC code: L01XX33 (WHO) M01AH01 (WHO)

Legal status
- Legal status: AU: S4 (Prescription only) or S3; BR: Class C1 (Other controlled substances); CA: ℞-only; NZ: Prescription only; UK: POM (Prescription only); US: ℞-only; In general: ℞ (Prescription only)

Pharmacokinetic data
- Bioavailability: Unknown
- Protein binding: 97% (mainly to serum albumin)
- Metabolism: Liver (mainly CYP2C9)
- Elimination half-life: 7.8 hours; 11 hours (mild hepatic impairment); 13 hours (moderate-severe hepatic impairment)
- Excretion: Faeces (57%), urine (27%)

Identifiers
- IUPAC name: 4-[5-(4-Methylphenyl)-3-(trifluoromethyl)pyrazol-1-yl]benzenesulfonamide
- CAS Number: 169590-42-5
- PubChem CID: 2662
- IUPHAR/BPS: 2892
- DrugBank: DB00482
- ChemSpider: 2562
- UNII: JCX84Q7J1L
- KEGG: D00567
- ChEBI: CHEBI:41423
- ChEMBL: ChEMBL118
- PDB ligand: CEL (PDBe, RCSB PDB)
- CompTox Dashboard (EPA): DTXSID0022777
- ECHA InfoCard: 100.211.644

Chemical and physical data
- Formula: C_{17}H_{14}F_{3}N_{3}O_{2}S
- Molar mass: 381.37 g·mol^{−1}
- 3D model (JSmol): Interactive image
- SMILES: c1cc(C)ccc1c2cc(C(F)(F)F)nn2c3ccc(cc3)S(=O)(=O)N
- InChI: InChI=1S/C17H14F3N3O2S/c1-11-2-4-12(5-3-11)15-10-16(17(18,19)20)22-23(15)13-6-8-14(9-7-13)26(21,24)25/h2-10H,1H3,(H2,21,24,25); Key:RZEKVGVHFLEQIL-UHFFFAOYSA-N

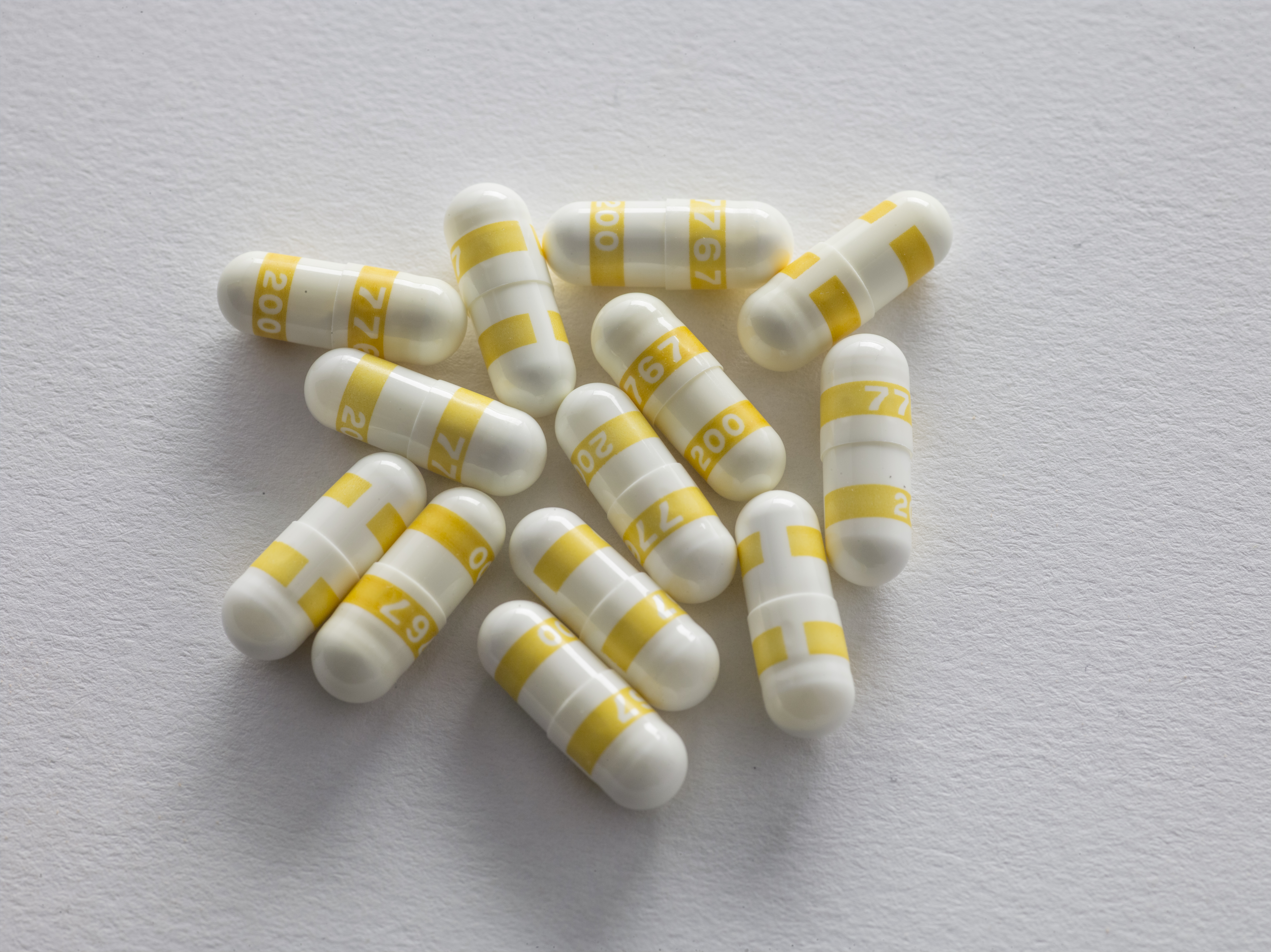
Celebrex capsules

Celecoxib, sold under the brand name Celebrex among others, is a COX-2 inhibitor and nonsteroidal anti-inflammatory drug (NSAID). It is used to treat the pain and inflammation in osteoarthritis, acute pain in adults, rheumatoid arthritis, psoriatic arthritis, ankylosing spondylitis, painful menstruation, and juvenile rheumatoid arthritis. It may also be used to decrease the risk of colorectal adenomas in people with familial adenomatous polyposis. It is taken by mouth. Benefits are typically seen within an hour.

Common side effects include abdominal pain, nausea, and diarrhea. Serious side effects may include heart attacks, strokes, gastrointestinal perforation, gastrointestinal bleeding, kidney failure, and anaphylaxis. Use is not recommended in people at high risk for heart disease. The risks are similar to other NSAIDs, such as ibuprofen and naproxen. Use in the later part of pregnancy or during breastfeeding is not recommended.

Celecoxib has demonstrated adjunctive benefits in major depression and efficacy in reducing polyp recurrence in familial adenomatous polyposis, while also being investigated for broader psychiatric, anticancer, and chemopreventive applications.

Celecoxib was patented in 1993 and came into medical use in 1999. It is available as a generic medication. In 2023, it was the 111th most commonly prescribed medication in the United States, with more than 6 million prescriptions.

== Medical uses ==
Celecoxib is indicated for the treatment of osteoarthritis, rheumatoid arthritis, psoriatic arthritis, acute pain, musculoskeletal pain, painful menstruation, ankylosing spondylitis, juvenile rheumatoid arthritis, and to reduce the number of colon and rectal polyps in people with familial adenomatous polyposis. It may be used in children with juvenile rheumatoid arthritis who are older than two years of age and weigh more than 10 kg (22 lb).

For postoperative pain, it is more or less equal to ibuprofen. For pain relief, it is similar to paracetamol (acetaminophen) at 3990 mg per day, which is the first line treatment for osteoarthritis.

Evidence of effects is not clear as several studies done by the manufacturer have not been released for independent analysis.

=== Familial adenomatous polyposis ===
It has been used to reduce colon and rectal polyps in people with familial adenomatous polyposis, but it is not known if it decreases rates of cancer, so it is not a good choice for this reason.

== Adverse effects ==
- Cardiovascular events: NSAIDs are associated with an increased risk of serious (and potentially fatal) adverse cardiovascular thrombotic events, including myocardial infarction and stroke. Risk may be increased with duration of use or pre-existing cardiovascular risk factors or disease. Individual cardiovascular risk profiles should be evaluated before prescribing. New-onset hypertension or exacerbation of hypertension may occur (NSAIDs may impair response to thiazide or loop diuretics), and may contribute to cardiovascular events; monitor blood pressure and use with caution in patients with hypertension. Celecoxib may cause sodium and fluid retention, so its use in patients with edema or heart failure warrants caution. Long-term cardiovascular risk in children has not been evaluated. Use the lowest effective dose for the shortest duration of time, consistent with individual patient goals, to reduce the risk of cardiovascular events; alternative therapies should be considered for patients at high risk. The increased risk is about 37%.
- Gastrointestinal events: NSAIDs may increase the risk of serious gastrointestinal (GI) ulceration, bleeding, and perforation (may be fatal). These events may occur at any time during therapy and without warning. Use caution with a history of GI disease (bleeding or ulcers), concurrent therapy with aspirin, anticoagulants and/or corticosteroids, smoking, use of alcohol, and the elderly or debilitated patients. Use the lowest effective dose for the shortest duration of time, consistent with individual patient goals, to reduce the risk of GI adverse events; alternate therapies should be considered for patients at high risk. When used concomitantly with ≤325 mg of aspirin, a substantial increase in the risk of gastrointestinal complications (e.g., ulcer) occurs; concomitant gastroprotective therapy (e.g., proton pump inhibitors) is recommended. The increased risk is about 81%.
- Hematologic effects: Anemia may occur; monitor hemoglobin or hematocrit in people on long-term treatment. Celecoxib does not usually affect prothrombin time, partial thromboplastin time, or platelet counts; it does not inhibit platelet aggregation at approved doses.

People with a prior history of ulcer disease or GI bleeding require special precautions. Moderate to severe liver impairment or GI toxicity can occur with or without warning symptoms in people treated with NSAIDs.

In October 2020, the U.S. Food and Drug Administration (FDA) required the prescribing information to be updated for all nonsteroidal anti-inflammatory medications to describe the risk of kidney problems in unborn babies that result in low amniotic fluid. They recommend avoiding NSAIDs in pregnant women at 20 weeks or later in pregnancy.

=== Allergy ===
Celecoxib contains a sulfonamide moiety and may cause allergic reactions in those allergic to other sulfonamide-containing drugs. This is in addition to the contraindication in people with severe allergies to other NSAIDs. However, it has a low (reportedly 4%) chance of inducing cutaneous reactions among persons who have a history of such reactions to aspirin or nonselective NSAIDs. NSAIDs may cause serious skin adverse events, including exfoliative dermatitis, Stevens-Johnson syndrome, and toxic epidermal necrolysis; events may occur without warning and in patients without prior known sulfa allergy. Use should be discontinued at the first sign of rash (or any other hypersensitivity).

=== Heart attack and stroke ===
A 2013 meta-analysis of hundreds of clinical trials found that coxibs (the class of drugs that includes celecoxib) increase the risk of major cardiovascular problems by about 37% over placebo. In 2016, a randomized trial provided strong evidence that treatment with celecoxib is not more likely to result in poor cardiovascular outcomes than treatment with naproxen or ibuprofen. As a result, in 2018 an FDA advisory panel concluded that celecoxib poses no greater risk for causing heart attacks and strokes than the commonly used NSAIDs ibuprofen or naproxen and recommended that the FDA consider changing its advice to physicians regarding celecoxib's safety.

The COX-2 inhibitor rofecoxib (Vioxx) was removed from the market in 2004 due to its risk. Like all NSAIDs on the US market, celecoxib carries an FDA-mandated "black box warning" for cardiovascular and gastrointestinal risk. In February 2007, the American Heart Association warned that with respect to "patients with a prior history of or at high risk for cardiovascular disease... use of COX-2 inhibitors for pain relief should be limited to patients for whom there are no appropriate alternatives, and then, only in the lowest dose and for the shortest duration necessary."

In 2005, a study published in the Annals of Internal Medicine found that cardiovascular effects of COX-2 inhibitors differ, depending on the drug. Other COX-2-selective inhibitors, such as rofecoxib, have significantly higher myocardial infarction rates than celecoxib. In April 2005, after an extensive review of data, the FDA concluded it was likely "that there is a 'class effect' for increased CV risk for all NSAIDs". In a 2006 meta-analysis of randomized control studies, the cerebrovascular events associated with COX-2 inhibitors were examined, but no significant risks were found when compared to nonselective NSAIDs or placebos.

=== Drug interactions ===
Celecoxib undergoes metabolism primarily by the enzymes CYP2C9 and CYP3A4, but it also interacts with CYP2D6, inhibiting its activity without being metabolized by it. The CYP2C9 gene exhibits considerable genetic variability, with common polymorphisms, such as rs1799853 and rs1057910, linked to reduced enzyme activity and altered pharmacokinetics of celecoxib. Additionally, the influence of CYP2D6 on celecoxib metabolism is inconsistent, with its effect varying depending on the individual's CYP2C9 genetic profile.

Caution must be exercised with concomitant use of 2C9 inhibitors, such as fluconazole, which can greatly elevate celecoxib serum levels. If used concomitantly with lithium, celecoxib increases lithium plasma levels. If used concomitantly with warfarin, celecoxib may result in an increased risk of bleeding complications. The risk of bleeding and gastric ulcers also increases further when selective serotonin reuptake inhibitors (SSRI) are used in combination with celecoxib. The drug may increase the risk of kidney failure with angiotensin-converting enzyme-inhibitors, such as lisinopril, and diuretics, such as hydrochlorothiazide.

== Mechanism of action ==
=== Anti-inflammatory ===
A highly selective reversible inhibitor of the COX-2 isoform of cyclooxygenase, celecoxib inhibits the transformation of arachidonic acid to prostaglandin precursors. Therefore, it has analgesic and anti-inflammatory properties. Nonselective NSAIDs (such as aspirin, naproxen, and ibuprofen) inhibit both COX-1 and COX-2. Inhibition of COX-1 (which celecoxib does not inhibit at therapeutic concentrations) inhibits the production of prostaglandins and the production of thromboxane A2, a platelet activator. COX-1 is traditionally defined as a constitutively expressed "housekeeping" enzyme and plays a role in the protection of the gastrointestinal mucosa, kidney hemodynamics, and platelet thrombogenesis. COX-2, on the contrary, is extensively expressed in cells involved in inflammation and is upregulated by bacterial lipopolysaccharides, cytokines, growth factors, and tumor promoters. Celecoxib is approximately 10-20 times more selective for COX-2 inhibition over COX-1. It binds with its polar sulfonamide side chain to a hydrophilic side pocket region close to the active COX-2 binding site. In theory, this selectivity allows celecoxib and other COX-2 inhibitors to reduce inflammation (and pain) while minimizing gastrointestinal adverse drug reactions (e.g. stomach ulcers) that are common with nonselective NSAIDs.

=== Anti-cancer ===
For its use in reducing colon polyps, celecoxib affects genes and pathways involved in inflammation and malignant transformation in tumors, but not normal tissues.

Celecoxib binds to Cadherin-11 (which may explain the reduction in cancer progression).

== Structure-activity relationship ==
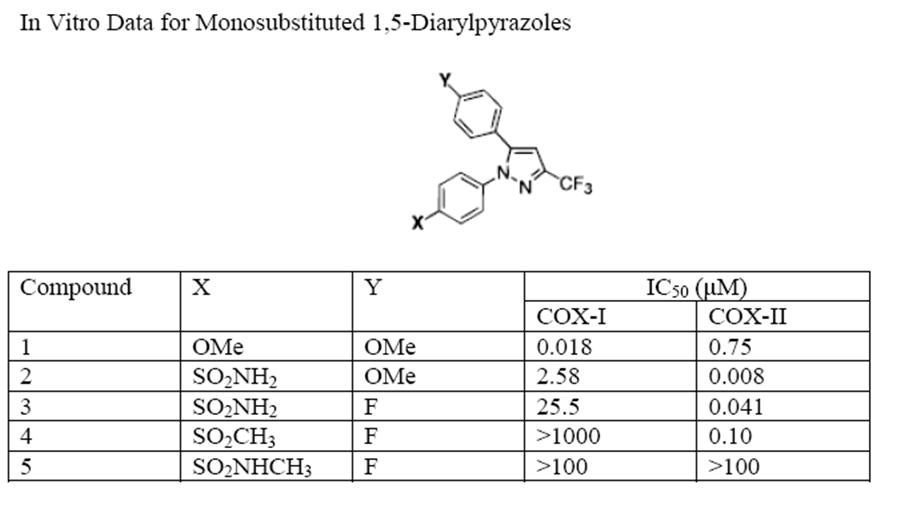

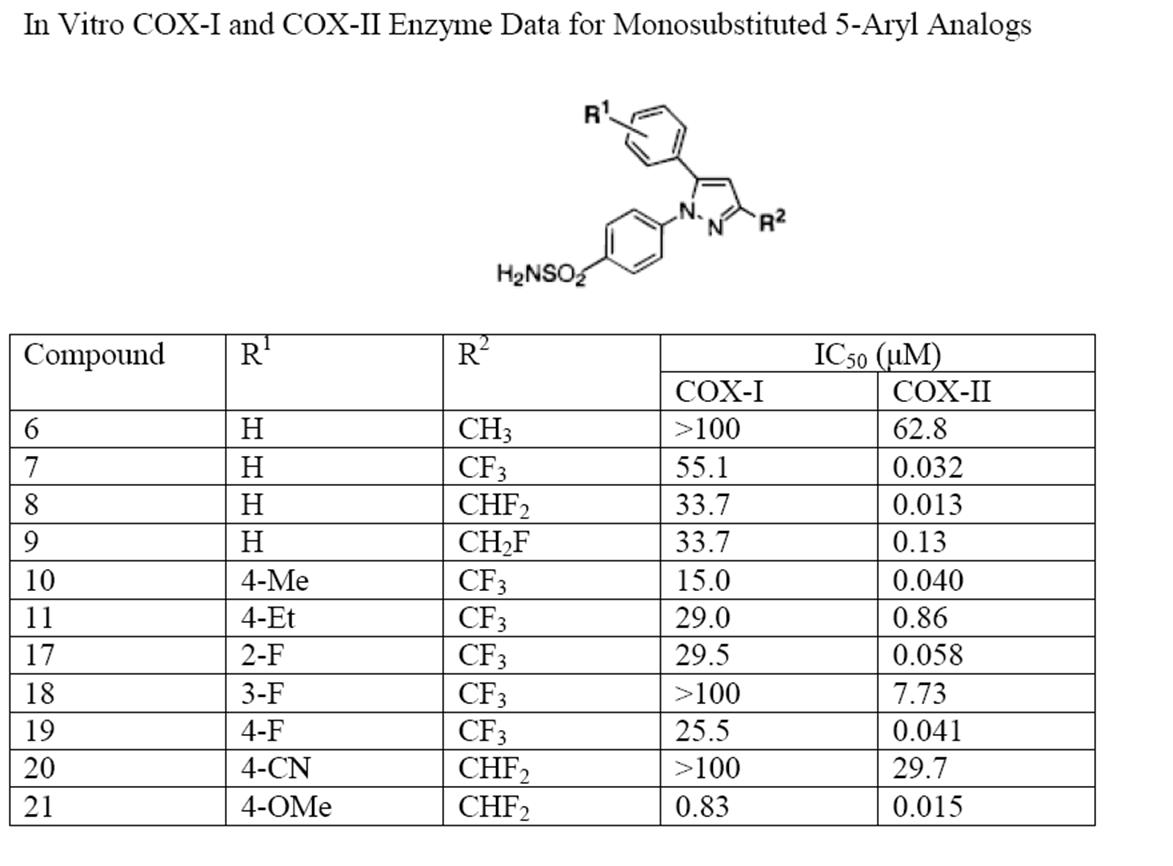

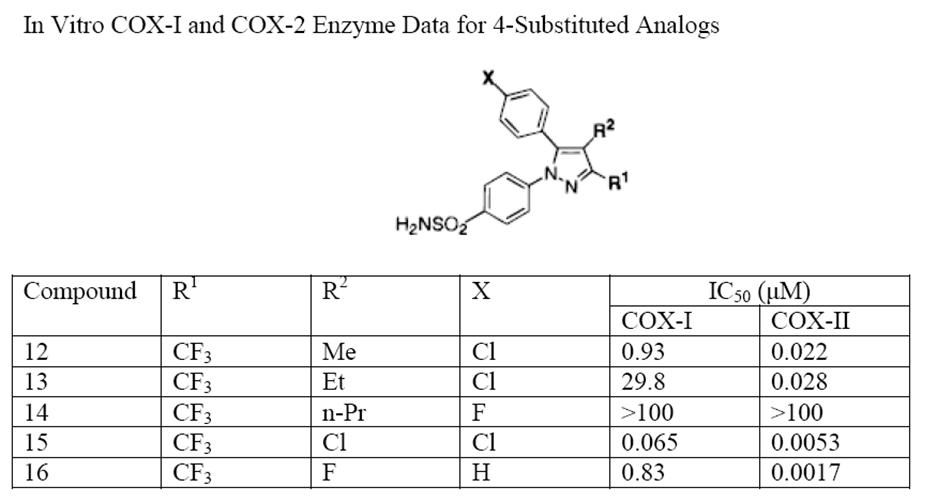

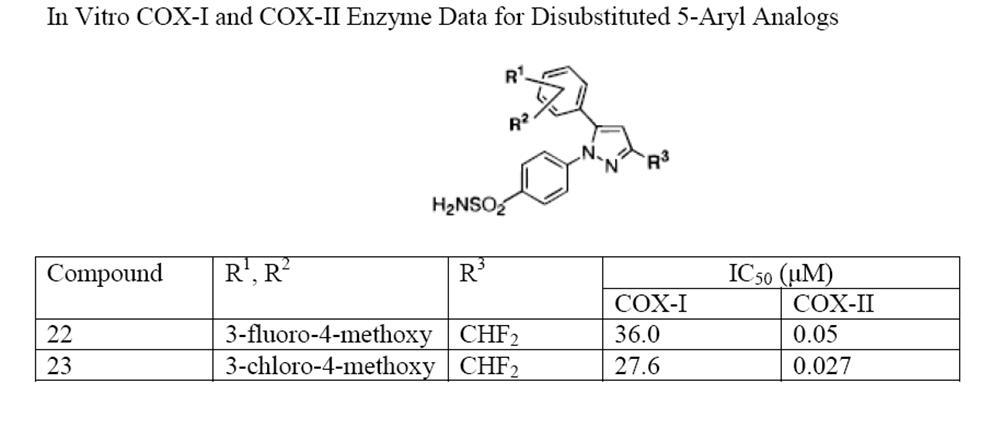

The Searle research group found the two appropriately substituted aromatic rings must reside on adjacent positions about the central ring for adequate COX-2 inhibition. Various modifications can be made to the 1,5-diarylpyrazole moiety to deduce the structure-activity relationship of celecoxib. A para-sulfamoylphenyl at position 1 of the pyrazole was found to have a higher potency for COX-2 selective inhibition than a para-methoxyphenyl (see structures 1 and 2, below). In addition, a 4-(methylsulfonyl)phenyl or 4-sulfamoylphenyl is known to be necessary for COX-2 inhibition. For instance, replacing either of these entities with a –SO_{2}NHCH_{3} substituent diminishes COX-2 inhibitory activity as noted with a very high inhibitory concentration-50 (see structures 3 – 5). At the 3-position of the pyrazole, a trifluoromethyl or difluoromethyl provides superior selectivity and potency compared to a fluoromethyl or methyl substitution (see structures 6 – 9).

Celecoxib is compound 22; the 4-sulfamoylphenyl on the 1-pyrazol substituent is required for COX-2 inhibition and the 4-methyl on the 5-pyrazol system has low steric hindrance to maximising potency, while the 3-trifluoromethyl group provides superior selectivity and potency. To explain the selectivity of celecoxib, it is necessary to analyze the free energy of binding difference between the drug molecule and COX-1 compared to COX-2 enzymes. The structural modifications highlight the importance of binding to residue 523 in the side binding pocket of the cyclooxygenase enzyme, which is an isoleucine in COX-1 and a valine in COX-2. This mutation appears to contribute to COX-2 selectivity by creating steric hindrance between the sulfonamide oxygen and the methyl group of Ile523 that effectively destabilizes the celecoxib-COX-1 complex.

== History ==
It was initially marketed by Pfizer for arthritis. Celecoxib and other COX-2 selective inhibitors, valdecoxib, parecoxib, and mavacoxib, were discovered by a team at the Searle division of Monsanto led by John Talley.

Two lawsuits arose over the discovery of celecoxib. Daniel L. Simmons of Brigham Young University (BYU) discovered the COX-2 enzyme in 1988, and in 1991, BYU entered into a collaboration with Monsanto to develop drugs to inhibit it. Monsanto's pharmaceutical division was later purchased by Pfizer, and in 2006, BYU sued Pfizer for breach of contract, claiming Pfizer did not properly pay contractual royalties back to BYU. A settlement was reached in April 2012, in which Pfizer agreed to pay $450 million. Other important discoveries in COX-2 were made at University of Rochester, which patented the discoveries. When the patent was issued, the university sued Searle (later Pfizer) in a case called, University of Rochester v. G.D. Searle & Co., 358 F.3d 916 (Fed. Cir. 2004). The court ruled in favor of Searle in 2004, holding in essence that the university had claimed a method requiring, yet provided no written description of, a compound that could inhibit COX-2, and therefore the patent was invalid.

According to the National Academy of Sciences, Philip Needleman, who was vice president of Monsanto in 1989 and president of Searle in 1993 oversaw research into COX-2 that led to the development of the anti-inflammatory drug celecoxib (Celebrex). He became senior executive vice president and chief scientist of Pharmacia from 2000 to 2003. Celecoxib was discovered and developed by G. D. Searle & Company and was approved by the FDA on 31 December 1998. It was co-promoted by Monsanto Company (parent company of Searle) and Pfizer under the brand name Celebrex. Monsanto merged with Pharmacia, from which the Medical Research Division was acquired by Pfizer, giving Pfizer ownership of Celebrex. The drug was at the core of a major patent dispute that was resolved in Searle's favor (later Pfizer) in 2004. In University of Rochester v. G.D. Searle & Co., 358 F.3d 916 (Fed. Cir. 2004), the University of Rochester claimed that United States Pat. No. 6,048,850 (which claimed a method of inhibiting COX-2 in humans using a compound, without actually disclosing what that compound might be) covered drugs such as celecoxib. The court ruled in favor of Searle, holding in essence that the university had claimed a method requiring, yet provided no written description of, a compound that could inhibit COX-2, and therefore the patent was invalid.

After the withdrawal of rofecoxib from the market in September 2004, celecoxib enjoyed a robust increase in sales. However, the results of the APC trial in December of that year raised concerns that Celebrex might carry risks similar to those of rofecoxib, and Pfizer announced a moratorium on direct-to-consumer advertising of Celebrex soon afterward. Sales reached $2 billion in 2006. Before its availability in generic form, it was one of Pfizer's "best-selling drugs, amounting to more than $2.5 billion in sales [by 2012], and was prescribed to 2.4 million" people in 2011. By 2012, 33 million Americans had taken celecoxib.

Pfizer resumed advertising Celebrex in magazines in 2006, and resumed television advertising in April 2007 with an unorthodox, 2 1/2-minute advertisement which extensively discussed the adverse effects of Celebrex in comparison with other anti-inflammatory drugs. The ad drew criticism from the consumer advocacy group Public Citizen, which called the ad's comparisons misleading. Pfizer responded to Public Citizen's concerns with assurances that they are truthfully advertising the risk and benefits of Celebrex as set forth by the FDA.

In 2025, Australian Therapeutic Goods Administration decided to include celecoxib 200 mg as the first Schedule 3 (Pharmacist Only Medicine) selective COX-2 inhibitor in a primary pack containing not more than 10 dosage units for the short-term treatment of acute pain due to primary dysmenorrhoea or musculoskeletal or soft tissue injury in adults.

== Society and culture ==
=== Fabricated efficacy studies ===
In 2000, Pfizer and Pharmacia presented findings from their Celebrex Long-Term Arthritis Safety Study (CLASS) in JAMA, reporting that it was better at preventing stomach complications than competitor drugs. However, federal investigators found that the companies deceptively reported only the first six months of results from a one-year trial. The following year, the Food and Drug Administration (FDA) showed that the full results did not demonstrate a statistically significant reduction in stomach complications. In 2012, a federal judge unsealed corporate documents further showcasing this deception in a long-running securities fraud case against Pfizer.

In March 2009, Scott S. Reuben, former chief of acute pain at Baystate Medical Center, Springfield, Massachusetts, revealed that the data for 21 studies he had authored for the efficacy of the drug (along with others such as Vioxx) had been fabricated. The analgesic effects of the drugs had been exaggerated. Reuben was also a former paid spokesperson for Pfizer. Although from 2002 to 2007 Pfizer underwrote much of Dr. Reuben's research and "many of his trials found that Celebrex and Lyrica, Pfizer drugs, were effective against postoperative pain," Pfizer was not aware of the fraudulent data. None of the retracted studies were submitted to either the US Food and Drug Administration or the European Union's regulatory agencies before the drug's approval. Although Pfizer issued a public statement declaring, "It is very disappointing to learn about Dr. Scott Reuben's alleged actions. When we decided to support Dr. Reuben's research, he worked for a credible academic medical center and appeared to be a reputable investigator", the documents unsealed in 2012, revealed that by February 2000, Pharmacia employees had devised a strategy to present the findings.

=== Brand names ===
Pfizer markets celecoxib under the brand name Celebrex, and it is available as oral capsules containing 50, 100, 200, or 400 mg of celecoxib.

It is legally available in many jurisdictions as a generic under several brand names. In the US, celecoxib was covered by three patents, two of which expired on 30 May 2014, and one of which (US RE44048) was due to expire 2 December 2015. On 13 March 2014, that patent was found to be invalid for double patenting. Upon the patent expiry on 30 May 2014, the FDA approved the first versions of generic celecoxib.

In the US, Celebrex is marketed by Viatris after Upjohn was spun off from Pfizer.

== Research ==
=== Psychiatry ===
On the theory that inflammation plays a role in the pathogenesis of major mental disorders, celecoxib has been trialed for a number of psychiatric disorders, including major depression, bipolar disorder, and schizophrenia. A 2014 meta-analysis concluded that adjunctive treatment with celecoxib improved depressive symptoms, response, and remission rates compared to placebo.

==== Bipolar disorder ====
A meta-analysis considering trials of celecoxib as an adjunctive treatment in bipolar disorder was inconclusive citing low evidence quality.

=== Familial adenomatous polyposis ===
It has been used to reduce colon and rectal polyps in people with familial adenomatous polyposis, but it is not known if it decreases rates of cancer, so it is not a good choice for this reason.

=== Cancer prevention ===
The use of celecoxib to reduce the risk of colorectal cancer has been investigated, but neither celecoxib nor any other drug is indicated for this use. Small-scale clinical trials in very high-risk people (belonging to FAP families) showed celecoxib can prevent polyp growth. Hence, large-scale randomized clinical trials were undertaken. Results show a 33 to 45% polyp recurrence reduction in people treated with celecoxib each day. However, serious cardiovascular events were significantly more frequent in the celecoxib-treated groups. Aspirin shows a similar (and possibly larger) protective effect, has demonstrated cardioprotective effects and is significantly cheaper, but no head-to-head clinical trials have compared the two drugs.

=== Cancer treatment ===
Different from cancer prevention, cancer treatment is focused on the therapy of tumors that have already formed and have established themselves inside the patient. Many studies are going on to determine whether celecoxib might be useful for this latter condition. However, during molecular studies in the laboratory, it became apparent that celecoxib could interact with other intracellular components besides its most famous target, COX-2. The discovery of these additional targets has generated much controversy, and the initial assumption that celecoxib reduces tumor growth primarily by the inhibition of COX-2 became contentious.

Certainly, the inhibition of COX-2 is paramount for the anti-inflammatory and analgesic function of celecoxib. However, whether inhibition of COX-2 also plays a dominant role in this drug's anticancer effects is unclear. For example, a recent study with malignant tumor cells showed celecoxib could inhibit the growth of these cells in vitro, but COX-2 played no role in this outcome; even more strikingly, the anticancer effects of celecoxib were also obtained with the use of cancer cell types that do not even contain COX-2. Karen Seibert and colleagues have published research showing antiangiogenic and antitumor activity of celecoxib in animal models.

Additional support for the idea that other targets besides COX-2 are important for celecoxib's anticancer effects has come from studies with chemically modified versions of celecoxib. Several dozen analogs of celecoxib were generated with small alterations in their chemical structures. Some of these analogs retained COX-2 inhibitory activity, whereas many others did not. However, when the ability of all these compounds to kill tumor cells in cell culture was investigated, the antitumor potency did not at all depend on whether or not the respective compound could inhibit COX-2, showing the inhibition of COX-2 was not required for the anticancer effects. One of these compounds, 2,5-dimethyl-celecoxib, which entirely lacks the ability to inhibit COX-2, actually displayed stronger anticancer activity than celecoxib.
