= Rofecoxib =

Nonsteroidal anti-inflammatory drug

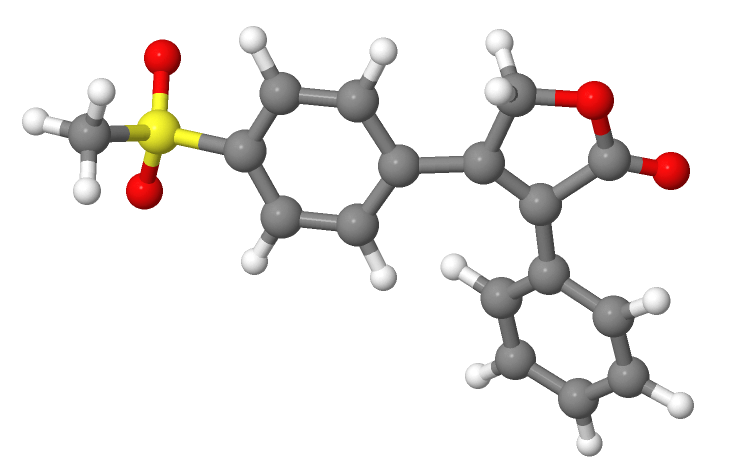

Clinical data
- Pronunciation: /ˌrɒfɪˈkɒksɪb/
- Trade names: Vioxx, Ceoxx, Ceeoxx, others
- Pregnancy category: AU: C
- Routes of administration: By mouth & i.m
- ATC code: M01AH02 (WHO)

Legal status
- Legal status: withdrawn worldwide

Pharmacokinetic data
- Bioavailability: 93%
- Protein binding: 87%
- Metabolism: liver
- Elimination half-life: 17 hours
- Excretion: bile duct/kidney

Identifiers
- IUPAC name: 4-(4-methylsulfonylphenyl)-3-phenyl-5H-furan-2-one
- CAS Number: 162011-90-7
- PubChem CID: 5090
- IUPHAR/BPS: 2893
- DrugBank: DB00533
- ChemSpider: 4911
- UNII: 0QTW8Z7MCR
- KEGG: D00568
- ChEBI: CHEBI:8887
- ChEMBL: ChEMBL122
- CompTox Dashboard (EPA): DTXSID2023567
- ECHA InfoCard: 100.230.077

Chemical and physical data
- Formula: C_{17}H_{14}O_{4}S
- Molar mass: 314.36 g·mol^{−1}
- 3D model (JSmol): Interactive image
- SMILES: O=C2OCC(=C2\c1ccccc1)\c3ccc(cc3)S(=O)(=O)C
- InChI: InChI=1S/C17H14O4S/c1-22(19,20)14-9-7-12(8-10-14)15-11-21-17(18)16(15)13-5-3-2-4-6-13/h2-10H,11H2,1H3; Key:RZJQGNCSTQAWON-UHFFFAOYSA-N

Rofecoxib is a COX-2-selective nonsteroidal anti-inflammatory drug (NSAID). It was marketed by Merck & Co. to treat osteoarthritis, rheumatoid arthritis, juvenile rheumatoid arthritis, acute pain conditions, migraine, and dysmenorrhea. Rofecoxib was approved in the United States by the Food and Drug Administration (FDA) in May 1999, and was marketed under the brand names Vioxx, Ceoxx, and Ceeoxx. Rofecoxib was available by prescription in both tablets and as an oral suspension.

Rofecoxib gained widespread use among physicians treating patients with arthritis and other conditions causing chronic or acute pain. Worldwide, over 80 million people were prescribed rofecoxib at some time.

In September 2004, Merck voluntarily withdrew rofecoxib from the market because of concerns about increased risk of heart attack and stroke associated with long-term, high-dosage use. Merck withdrew the drug after disclosures that it withheld information about rofecoxib's risks from doctors and patients for over five years, allegedly resulting in between 88,000 and 140,000 cases of serious heart disease in the United States alone. Rofecoxib was one of the most widely used drugs ever to be withdrawn from the market. In the year before withdrawal, Merck had sales revenue of US$2.5 billion from Vioxx.

In 2005, the FDA issued a memorandum concluding that risks for serious cardiovascular (CV) events seem to be as great for nonselective NSAIDs as for COX-2–selective agents such as rofecoxib, according to long-term, controlled clinical trials. Based on data up to 2015, the FDA reasserted the likelihood of an increased risk of serious adverse CV events from COX-2–selective and nonselective NSAIDs, dependent on dose and duration.

In November 2017, Massachusetts-based Tremeau Pharmaceuticals announced its plan to return rofecoxib (TRM-201) to market as a treatment for hemophilic arthropathy (HA). Tremeau announced that the FDA had granted an orphan designation for TRM-201 (rofecoxib) for the treatment of HA, and that they had received FDA feedback on their development plan. HA is a degenerative joint disease caused by recurrent intra-articular bleeding. It is the largest cause of morbidity in patients with hemophilia and has no currently approved treatment options in the United States. Traditional NSAIDs are avoided in this population because of their effects on platelet aggregation and risk of gastrointestinal ulcers, and high potency opioids are the current standard of care in treating HA.

== Mode of action ==
Cyclooxygenase (COX) has two well-studied isoforms, called COX-1 and COX-2. COX-1 mediates the synthesis of prostaglandins responsible for protection of the stomach lining, while COX-2 mediates the synthesis of prostaglandins responsible for pain and inflammation. By creating "selective" NSAIDs that inhibit COX-2, but not COX-1, the same pain relief as traditional NSAIDs is offered, but with greatly reduced risk of fatal or debilitating peptic ulcers. Rofecoxib is a selective COX-2 inhibitor, or "coxib".

Though the class of coxibs includes several agents, degrees of COX-2 selectivity vary among them, with celecoxib (Celebrex) being the least COX-2 selective, and rofecoxib (Vioxx), valdecoxib (Bextra), and etoricoxib (Arcoxia), being highly COX-2 selective.

At the time of its withdrawal, rofecoxib was the only coxib approved in the United States with clinical evidence of its superior gastrointestinal adverse effect profile over conventional NSAIDs. This was largely based on the VIGOR (Vioxx GI Outcomes Research) study, which compared the efficacy and adverse effect profiles of rofecoxib and naproxen.

=== Pharmacokinetics ===
The therapeutic recommended dosages were 12.5, 25, and 50 mg with an approximate bioavailability of 93%. Rofecoxib crossed the placenta and blood–brain barrier, and took 1–3 hours to reach peak plasma concentration with an effective half-life (based on steady-state levels) around 17 hours. The metabolic products are cis-dihydro and trans-dihydro derivatives of rofecoxib which are primarily excreted through urine.

== Efficacy ==
Rofecoxib was approved by the FDA to treat osteoarthritis, rheumatoid arthritis, juvenile rheumatoid arthritis, acute pain conditions, migraine, and dysmenorrhea. When it was marketed, it gained widespread acceptance among physicians treating patients with arthritis and other conditions causing chronic or acute pain.

=== Premenstrual acne ===
A 2003 placebo-controlled, small, short-term study in India of 80 women with premenstrual acne vulgaris, who were given rofecoxib or placebo for two cycles of 10 days, suggests that "rofecoxib is effective in the management of premenstrual acne.

=== Fabricated efficacy studies ===
On March 11, 2009, Scott S. Reuben, former chief of acute pain at Baystate Medical Center, Springfield, Mass., revealed that data for 21 studies he had authored for the efficacy of the drug (along with others such as celecoxib) had been fabricated, overstating the analgesic effects of the drugs. No evidence has been found that Reuben colluded with Merck in falsifying his data. Reuben was also a former paid spokesperson for the drug company Pfizer (which owns the intellectual property rights for marketing celecoxib in the United States). The retracted studies were not submitted to either the FDA or the European Union's regulatory agencies prior to the drug's approval. Drug manufacturer Merck had no comment on the disclosure.

== Side effects ==
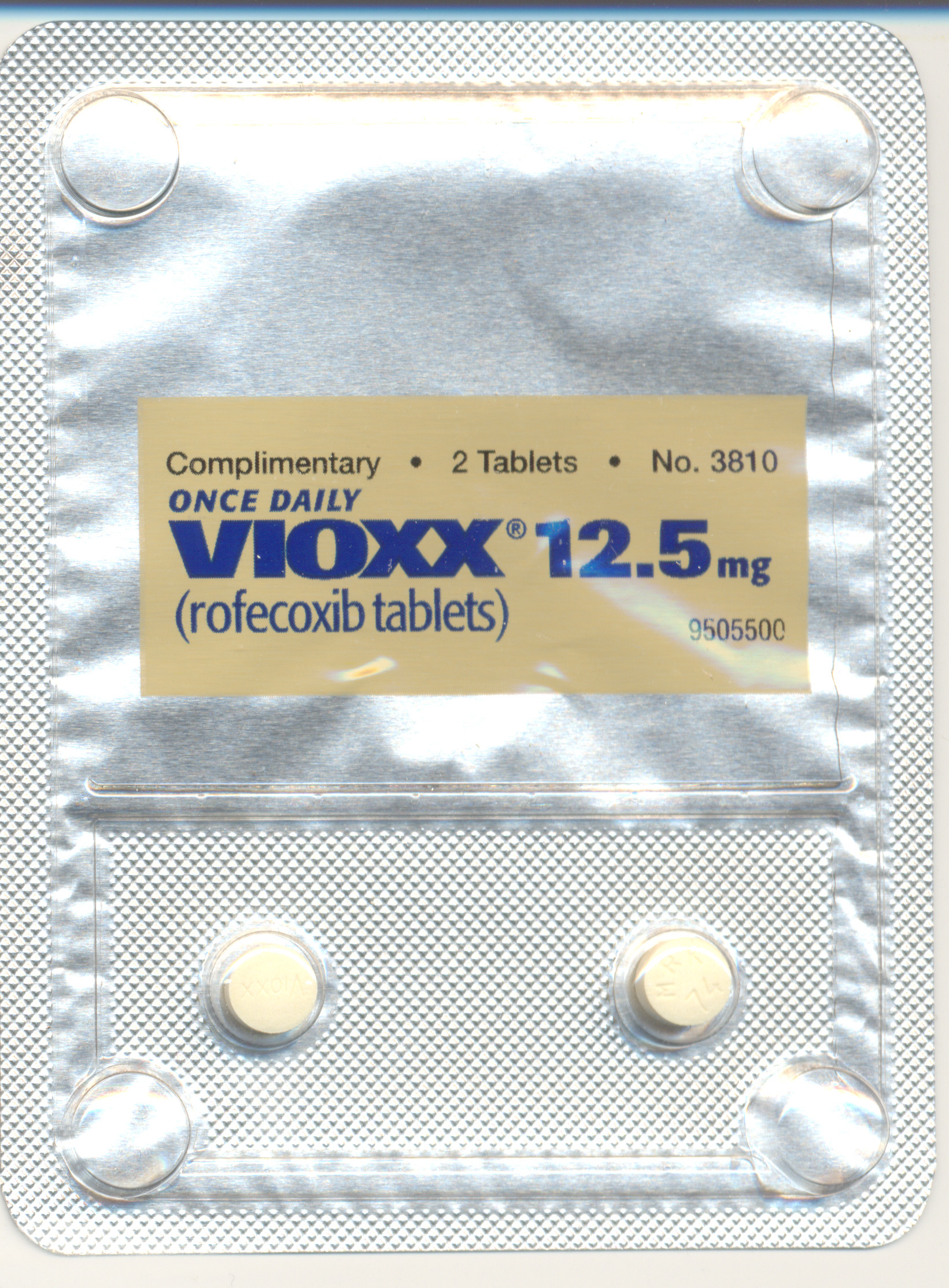
A VIOXX (rofecoxib) sample blister pack

In addition to the reduced incidence of gastric ulceration, rofecoxib exhibits no effect on bleeding time or platelet aggregation, even at supratherapeutic doses. Aside from these features, rofecoxib exhibits a similar adverse-effect profile to other NSAIDs.

=== Heart and blood vessels ===
==== VIGOR study and publishing controversy ====
The Vioxx Gastrointestinal Outcomes Research (VIGOR) study led by Claire Bombardier compared the efficacy and adverse-effect profiles of a therapeutic dose of rofecoxib (50 mg/day) vs. a common dose of naproxen (500 mg/BID). The VIGOR study found that those on rofecoxib faced 4.25 times the relative risk of acute myocardial infarction as compared to those on naproxen over a mean duration of nine months. However, there was no significant difference in the mortality from cardiovascular events between the two groups. Furthermore, patients without high cardiovascular risk showed no significant difference in the rate of myocardial infarction between the treatment groups.

Merck's scientists interpreted the finding as a protective effect of naproxen, telling the FDA that the difference in heart attacks "is primarily due to" this protective effect. The Martin Report excused senior management by stating they believed they were victims of Pfizer's alleged manipulation of test results to promote their product as a safer alternative. Some commentators have noted that naproxen would have to be three times as effective as aspirin to account for all of the difference, and some outside scientists warned Merck that this claim was implausible before VIGOR was published. No evidence has since emerged for such a large cardioprotective effect of naproxen, although a number of studies have found protective effects similar in size to those of aspirin.

The results of the VIGOR study were submitted to the United States FDA in February 2001. In September 2001, the FDA sent a warning letter to the CEO of Merck, stating, "Your promotional campaign discounts the fact that in the VIGOR study, patients on Vioxx were observed to have a four- to five-fold increase in myocardial infarctions (MIs) compared to patients on the comparator nonsteroidal anti-inflammatory drug (NSAID), Naprosyn (naproxen)." This led to the introduction, in April 2002, of warnings on Vioxx labeling concerning the increased risk of cardiovascular events (heart attack and stroke).

Months after the preliminary version of VIGOR was published in the New England Journal of Medicine in November 2000, the journal editors learned that certain data reported to the FDA were not included in the NEJM article. Several years later, when they were shown a Merck memo during the depositions for the first federal Vioxx trial, they realized that these data had been available to the authors months before publication. The editors wrote an editorial accusing the authors of deliberately withholding the data. They released the editorial to the media on December 8, 2005, before giving the authors a chance to respond. NEJM editor Gregory Curfman explained that the quick release was due to the imminent presentation of his deposition testimony, which he feared would be misinterpreted in the media. He had earlier denied any relationship between the timing of the editorial and the trial. Although his testimony was not actually used in the December trial, Curfman had testified well before the publication of the editorial.

The editors charged that "more than four months before the article was published, at least two of its authors were aware of critical data on an array of adverse cardiovascular events that were not included in the VIGOR article." These additional data included three additional heart attacks, and raised the relative risk of Vioxx from 4.25-fold to 5-fold. All the additional heart attacks occurred in the group at low risk of heart attack (the "aspirin not indicated" group) and the editors noted that the omission "resulted in the misleading conclusion that there was a difference in the risk of myocardial infarction between the aspirin indicated and aspirin not indicated groups." The relative risk for myocardial infarctions among the aspirin not indicated patients increased from 2.25 to 3 (although it remained statistically insignificant). The editors also noted a statistically significant (two-fold) increase in risk for serious thromboembolic events for this group, an outcome that Merck had not reported in the NEJM, though it had disclosed that information publicly in March 2000, eight months before publication.

The authors of the study, including the non-Merck authors, responded by claiming that the three additional heart attacks had occurred after the prespecified cutoff date for data collection, thus were appropriately not included. (Using the prespecified cutoff date also meant that an additional stroke in the naproxen population was not reported.) Furthermore, they said that the additional data did not qualitatively change any of the conclusions of the study, and the results of the full analyses were disclosed to the FDA and reflected on the Vioxx warning label. They further noted that all of the data in the "omitted" table were printed in the text of the article. The authors stood by the original article.

NEJM stood by its editorial, noting that the cutoff date was never mentioned in the article, nor did the authors report that the cutoff for cardiovascular adverse events was before that for gastrointestinal adverse events. The different cutoffs increased the reported benefits of Vioxx (reduced stomach problems) relative to the risks (increased heart attacks).

Some scientists have accused the NEJM editorial board of making unfounded accusations. Others have applauded the editorial. Renowned research cardiologist Eric Topol, a prominent Merck critic, accused Merck of "manipulation of data" and said "I think now the scientific misconduct trial is really fully backed up". Phil Fontanarosa, executive editor of the prestigious Journal of the American Medical Association, welcomed the editorial, saying "this is another in the long list of recent examples that have generated real concerns about trust and confidence in industry-sponsored studies".

On May 15, 2006, the Wall Street Journal reported that a late-night email, written by an outside public relations specialist and sent to Journal staffers hours before the Expression of Concern was released, predicted that "the rebuke would divert attention to Merck and induce the media to ignore the New England Journal of Medicine's own role in aiding Vioxx sales."

"Internal emails show the New England Journal's expression of concern was timed to divert attention from a deposition in which Executive Editor Gregory Curfman made potentially damaging admissions about the journal's handling of the Vioxx study. In the deposition, part of the Vioxx litigation, Dr. Curfman acknowledged that lax editing might have helped the authors make misleading claims in the article." The Journal stated that NEJM's "ambiguous" language misled reporters into incorrectly believing that Merck had deleted data regarding the three additional heart attacks, rather than a blank table that contained no statistical information; "the New England Journal says it didn't attempt to have these mistakes corrected." Investigations revealed that Merck had several years worth of information suggesting an elevated risk of cardiac events, and Vice President Edward Scolnick took much of the blame for the suppression of this information.

The FDA reviewers were aware of the potential for cardiovascular risk in 1999and it was argued that Merck had manipulated their EKG tests one week after the external review board provided their consultation to specifically exclude high risk factors from the trial subjects to avoid finding effect then predated the changes to their trials to almost three months earlier.

==== Alzheimer's disease ====
In 2000 and 2001, Merck conducted several studies of rofecoxib aimed at determining if the drug slowed the onset of Alzheimer's disease. Merck has placed great emphasis on these studies on the grounds that they are relatively large (almost 3000 patients) and compared rofecoxib to a placebo rather than to another pain reliever. These studies found an elevated death rate among rofecoxib patients, although the deaths were not generally heart-related. However, they did not find any elevated cardiovascular risk from rofecoxib. Before 2004, Merck cited these studies as providing evidence, contrary to VIGOR, of rofecoxib's safety.

==== APPROVe study ====
In 2001, Merck commenced the APPROVe (Adenomatous Polyp PRevention On Vioxx) study, a three-year trial with the primary aim of evaluating the efficacy of rofecoxib for the prophylaxis of colorectal polyps. Celecoxib had already been approved for this indication, and it was hoped to add this to the indications for rofecoxib, as well. An additional aim of the study was to further evaluate the cardiovascular safety of rofecoxib.

The APPROVe study was terminated early when the preliminary data from the study showed an increased relative risk of adverse thrombotic cardiovascular events (including heart attack and stroke), beginning after 18 months of rofecoxib therapy. In patients taking rofecoxib, versus placebo, the relative risk of these events was 1.92 (rofecoxib 1.50 events vs placebo 0.78 events per 100 patient years). The results from the first 18 months of the APPROVe study did not show an increased relative risk of adverse cardiovascular events. Moreover, overall and cardiovascular mortality rates were similar between the rofecoxib and placebo populations.

In summary, the APPROVe study suggested that long-term use of rofecoxib resulted in nearly twice the risk of suffering a heart attack or stroke compared to patients receiving a placebo.

==== Other studies ====
Some preapproval phase III clinical trials, like the APPROVe study, showed no increased relative risk of adverse cardiovascular events for the first 18 months of rofecoxib usage. Others have pointed out that "study 090", a preapproval trial, showed a three-fold increase in cardiovascular events compared to placebo, a seven-fold increase compared to nabumetone (another NSAID), and an eight-fold increase in heart attacks and strokes combined compared to both control groups. Although this was a relatively small study, and only the last result was statistically significant, critics have charged that this early finding should have prompted Merck to quickly conduct larger studies of rofecoxib's cardiovascular safety. Merck notes that it had already begun VIGOR at the time Study 090 was completed. Although VIGOR was primarily designed to demonstrate new uses for rofecoxib, it also collected data on adverse cardiovascular outcomes.

Several very large observational studies have also found elevated risk of heart attack from rofecoxib. For example, a retrospective study of 113,000 elderly Canadians published in 2005 suggested a borderline statistically significant increased relative risk of heart attacks of 1·24 from Vioxx usage, with a relative risk of 1·73 for higher-dose Vioxx usage.. Another 2005 study comparing celecoxib and refecoxib, using Kaiser Permanente data, found a 1·47 relative risk for low-dose Vioxx usage and 3·58 relative risk for high-dose Vioxx usage, though the smaller number was not statistically significant, and relative risk compared to other populations was not statistically significant.

Furthermore, a 2006 meta-study of 114 randomized trials with a total of 116,000+ participants, published in JAMA, showed that Vioxx uniquely increased risk of renal (kidney) disease, and heart arrhythmia.

==== Other COX-2 inhibitors ====
In 2005, the FDA issued a memo concluding that, along with the other approved COX-2 selective NSAIDs available at the time (i.e., celecoxib, and valdecoxib), rofecoxib was associated with an increased risk of serious adverse cardiovascular events compared to placebo. They also noted that the available data did not permit a rank ordering of these drugs with regard to cardiovascular risk.

Only Celebrex (generic name is celecoxib) is still available for purchase in the United States.

Regulatory authorities worldwide now require warnings about cardiovascular risk of COX-2 inhibitors still on the market. For example, in 2005, EU regulators required the following changes to the product information and/or packaging of all COX-2 inhibitors:

- Contraindications stating that COX-2 inhibitors must not be used in patients with established ischaemic heart disease and/or cerebrovascular disease (stroke), and also in patients with peripheral arterial disease
- Reinforced warnings to healthcare professionals to exercise caution when prescribing COX-2 inhibitors to patients with risk factors for heart disease, such as hypertension, hyperlipidaemia (high cholesterol levels), diabetes and smoking
- Given the association between cardiovascular risk and exposure to COX-2 inhibitors, doctors are advised to use the lowest effective dose for the shortest possible duration of treatment

==== Other NSAIDs ====
Since the withdrawal of Vioxx, it has come to light that there may be negative cardiovascular effects associated with not only other COX-2 inhibitors, but the majority of other NSAIDs. It is only with the recent development of drugs like Vioxx that drug companies have carried out the kind of well executed trials that could establish such effects and these sorts of trials have never been carried out in older "trusted" NSAIDs such as ibuprofen, diclofenac and others. The possible exceptions may be aspirin and naproxen because of their anti-platelet aggregation properties.

Analyses in 2011 and 2013 by McGettigan and the Coxib and traditional NSAID Trialists (CNT) Collaborators, respectively, demonstrated that the risk of serious CV events was a dose dependent effect of COX-2 selective and nonselective NSAIDs, with the possible exception of naproxen, and that high therapeutic doses of nonselective NSAIDs (e.g. ibuprofen 2400 mg/day, diclofenac 150 mg/day) carried similar CV risk when compared to a combined group of therapeutic and supra-therapeutic doses of COX-2 selective NSAIDs (such as rofecoxib).

In 2014, Patrono and Baigent, summarizing all of the currently available data in a review article in Circulation, concluded that with the exception of GI toxicity, neither the efficacy nor the major cardiorenal complications of COX-2 selective NSAIDs appear to be influenced by their level of COX-2 selectivity. They concluded that the CV risk associated with NSAIDs was dependent on dose and duration.

This conclusion was further reinforced by the 2016 results of the celecoxib PRECISION trial, which showed no difference in CV event rates between the COX-2 selective NSAID celecoxib and the non-selective NSAIDs ibuprofen and naproxen.

== Withdrawal ==
As a result of the findings of its own APPROVe study, Merck publicly announced its voluntary withdrawal of the drug from the market worldwide on September 30, 2004.

In addition to its own studies, on September 23, 2004, Merck apparently received information about new research by the FDA that supported previous findings of increased risk of heart attack among rofecoxib users. One FDA analyst estimated that, based upon his mathematical model, Vioxx may have caused between 88,000 and 139,000 heart attacks, 30 to 40 percent of which were probably fatal, in the five years the drug was on the market. Senior FDA officials were quick to note, however, that this estimate was based solely on a mathematical model, and must be interpreted with caution. Furthermore, his analysis only concerned Americans.

On November 5, 2004, the medical journal The Lancet published a meta-analysis of the available studies on the safety of rofecoxib. The authors concluded that, owing to the known cardiovascular risk, rofecoxib should have been withdrawn several years earlier. The Lancet published an editorial which condemned both Merck and the FDA for the continued availability of rofecoxib from 2000 until the recall. Merck responded by issuing a rebuttal of the Jüni et al. meta-analysis that noted that Jüni omitted several studies that showed no increased cardiovascular risk.

=== Martin Report ===
In 2005, Merck spent $21 million to retain John S. Martin Jr., a former District Judge for the Southern District of New York, and his firm, Debevoise & Plimpton, to investigate the Vioxx study results and Merck communications. The resulting "Martin Report" was published in February 2006 and found that Merck's senior management acted in good faith. The report attributed confusion over the clinical safety of Vioxx to the sales team's overzealous behavior. Merck was satisfied with the report findings and promised to consider its recommendations, while the press criticized its conclusions as self-serving.

== FDA position ==
In 2005, American and Canadian advisory panels encouraged the return of rofecoxib to the market, stating that the drug's benefits outweighed the risks it posed to some patients. The FDA advisory panel voted 17-15 to allow the drug to return to the market despite being found to increase heart risk. The vote in Canada was 12-1, and the Canadian panel noted that the cardiovascular risks from rofecoxib seemed to be no worse than those from ibuprofen, while encouraging further study of all NSAIDs to fully understand their risk profiles. Despite this regulatory approval, Merck has not returned rofecoxib to the market.

Following the 2005 FDA Advisory Committee, the FDA issued a memo concluding that data from large long-term controlled clinical trials do not clearly demonstrate that COX-2 selective agents (including rofecoxib) have a greater risk of serious cardiovascular events than non-selective NSAIDs. In 2015, the FDA reinforced this conclusion, stating that the available data support a dose and duration-dependent effect on the risk of serious adverse cardiovascular events for COX-2 selective and non-selective NSAIDs.

== Litigation ==
By March 2006, there were over 10,000 cases and 190 class actions filed against Merck over adverse cardiovascular events associated with rofecoxib and the adequacy of Merck's warnings. The first wrongful death trial, Rogers v. Merck, was scheduled in Alabama in the spring of 2005, but was postponed after Merck argued that the plaintiff had falsified evidence of rofecoxib use.

On August 19, 2005, a jury in Texas voted 10–2 to hold Merck liable for the death of Robert Ernst, a 59-year-old man who allegedly died of a rofecoxib-induced heart attack. Merck argued that the death was due to cardiac arrhythmia, which had not been shown to be associated with rofecoxib use. The jury awarded Carol Ernst, widow of Robert Ernst, $253.4 million in damages. This award was capped at no more than US$26.1 million because of punitive damages limits under Texas law. Merck appealed and the verdict was overturned in 2008. On November 3, 2005, Merck won the second case Humeston v. Merck, a personal injury case, in Atlantic City, New Jersey. The plaintiff experienced a mild myocardial infarction and claimed that rofecoxib was responsible, after having taken it for two months. Merck argued that there was no evidence that rofecoxib was the cause of Humeston's injury and that there is no scientific evidence linking rofecoxib to cardiac events with short durations of use. The jury ruled that Merck had adequately warned doctors and patients of the drug's risk.

The first federal trial on rofecoxib, Plunkett v. Merck, began on November 29, 2005, in Houston. The trial ended on December 12, 2005, when Judge Eldon E. Fallon of U.S. District Court declared a mistrial because of a hung jury with an eight to one majority, favoring the defense. Upon retrial in February 2006 in New Orleans, where the Vioxx multidistrict litigation (MDL) is based, a jury found Merck not liable, even though the plaintiffs had the NEJM editor testify as to his objections to the VIGOR study.

On January 30, 2006, a New Jersey state court dismissed a case brought by Edgar Lee Boyd, who blamed Vioxx for gastrointestinal bleeding that he experienced after taking the drug. The judge said that Boyd failed to prove the drug caused his stomach pain and internal bleeding.

In January 2006, Garza v. Merck began trial in Rio Grande City, Texas. The plaintiff, a 71-year-old smoker with heart disease, had a fatal heart attack three weeks after finishing a one-week sample of rofecoxib. On April 21, 2006 the jury awarded the plaintiff $7 million compensatory and $25 million punitive. The Texas Courts of Appeals in San Antonio later ruled Garza's fatal heart attack probably resulted from pre-existing health conditions unrelated to his taking of Vioxx, thus reversing the $32 million jury award.

On April 5, 2006, a jury held Merck liable for the heart attack of 77-year-old John McDarby, and awarded McDarby $4.5 million in compensatory damages based on Merck's failure to properly warn of Vioxx safety risks. After a hearing on April 11, 2006, the jury also awarded Mr. McDarby an additional $9 million in punitive damages. The same jury found Merck not liable for the heart attack of 60-year-old Thomas Cona, a second plaintiff in the trial, but was liable for fraud in the sale of the drug to Cona.

In March 2010, an Australian class-action lawsuit against Merck ruled that Vioxx doubled the risk of heart attacks, and that Merck had breached the Trade Practices Act by selling a drug which was unfit for sale.

By November 2007 Merck announced that it agreed on a mass tort settlement of $4.85 billion between Merck and the lawyers of 27,000 individual lawsuits with a try-every-case strategy as opposed to a class action lawsuit if "85 percent of the plaintiffs sign up". After the settlement, the lawyers for the case disputed the $315 million awarded in legal fees. Ultimately, the judge determined how the fees would be awarded to the plaintiff's attorneys. Judge Eldon E. Fallon of the United States District Court for the Eastern District of Louisiana additionally ordered the plaintiff lawyers to cap their fees at 32% of the settlement amount.

The above dispute over lawyer fees has caused scholars and observers to consider tort reform throughout the country. Articles on the subject include The Vioxx Litigation: A Critical Look at Trial Tactics, the Tort System, and the Roles of Lawyers in Mass Tort Litigation and 10 Years of Tort Reform in Texas Bring Fewer Suits, Lower Payouts.

In November 2011, Merck announced a civil settlement with the US Attorney's Office for the District of Massachusetts, and individually with 43 US states and the District of Columbia, to resolve civil claims relating to Vioxx. Under the terms of the settlement, Merck agreed to pay two-thirds of a previously recorded $950 million reserve charge in exchange for release from civil liability. Litigation with seven additional states remains outstanding. Under separate criminal proceedings, Merck pleaded guilty to a federal misdemeanor charge relating to the marketing of the drug across state lines, incurring a fine of $321.6 million.

== Possible return to market ==
In November 2017, Massachusetts-based Tremeau Pharmaceuticals announced its plan to return rofecoxib (TRM-201) to market as a treatment for hemophilic arthropathy (HA). Tremeau announced that the FDA had granted an orphan designation for TRM-201 (rofecoxib) for the treatment of HA, and that they had received FDA feedback on their development plan. HA is a degenerative joint disease caused by recurrent intra-articular bleeding. It is the largest cause of morbidity in patients with hemophilia and has no currently approved treatment options in the United States. Traditional NSAIDs are avoided in this population due to their effects on platelet aggregation and risk of gastrointestinal ulcers, and high potency opioids are the current standard of care in treating HA.

In March 2019 Tremeau announced that they had hired as chief development officer a former Merck employee who had been a product development team leader and also was responsible for executive oversight for numerous clinical trials for the COX-2 inhibitor VIOXX (rofecoxib). Tremeau also announced an upcoming clinical trial for rofecoxib and that they were seeking investigators.

On February 15, 2022, California-based BriOri Biotech announced that it had been issued a patent covering topical formulations of rofecoxib.

== See also ==
- COX-2 selective inhibitor
- Discovery and development of cyclooxygenase 2 inhibitors
- David Graham (epidemiologist)
- Merck & Co. v. Reynolds, a United States Supreme Court litigating issues related to Vioxx.
