= Valdecoxib =

Nonsteroidal anti-inflammatory drug

Clinical data
- Trade names: Bextra
- Pregnancy category: AU: C; May cause premature closure of the ductus arteriosus
- Routes of administration: Oral
- ATC code: M01AH03 (WHO)

Legal status
- Legal status: AU: S4 (Prescription only); BR: Class C1 (Other controlled substances); Withdrawn in U.S., EU, Canada and parts of Asia

Pharmacokinetic data
- Bioavailability: 83%
- Protein binding: 98%
- Metabolism: Hepatic (CYP3A4 and 2C9 involved)
- Elimination half-life: 8 to 11 hours
- Excretion: Renal

Identifiers
- IUPAC name: 4-(5-methyl-3-phenylisoxazol-4-yl)benzenesulfonamide
- CAS Number: 181695-72-7
- PubChem CID: 119607
- IUPHAR/BPS: 2894
- DrugBank: DB00580
- ChemSpider: 106796
- UNII: 2919279Q3W
- KEGG: D02709
- ChEBI: CHEBI:63634
- ChEMBL: ChEMBL865
- CompTox Dashboard (EPA): DTXSID6044226
- ECHA InfoCard: 100.229.918

Chemical and physical data
- Formula: C_{16}H_{14}N_{2}O_{3}S
- Molar mass: 314.36 g·mol^{−1}
- 3D model (JSmol): Interactive image
- SMILES: O=S(=O)(N)c3ccc(c2c(onc2c1ccccc1)C)cc3
- InChI: InChI=1S/C16H14N2O3S/c1-11-15(12-7-9-14(10-8-12)22(17,19)20)16(18-21-11)13-5-3-2-4-6-13/h2-10H,1H3,(H2,17,19,20); Key:LNPDTQAFDNKSHK-UHFFFAOYSA-N

Valdecoxib is a nonsteroidal anti-inflammatory drug (NSAID) used in the treatment of osteoarthritis, rheumatoid arthritis, and painful menstruation and menstrual symptoms. It is a selective cyclooxygenase-2 inhibitor. It was patented in 1995.

Valdecoxib was manufactured and marketed under the brand name Bextra by G. D. Searle & Company as an anti-inflammatory arthritis drug. It was approved by the United States Food and Drug Administration (FDA) on November 20, 2001, to treat arthritis and menstrual cramps, and was available by prescription in tablet form until 2005 when the FDA requested that Pfizer (Searle's parent company) withdraw Bextra from the American market. The FDA cited "potential increased risk for serious cardiovascular (CV) adverse events," an "increased risk of serious skin reactions" and the "fact that Bextra has not been shown to offer any unique advantages over the other available NSAIDs."

In 2009, Bextra was at the center of the "largest health-care fraud settlement and the largest criminal fine of any kind ever." Pfizer paid a $2.3 billion civil and criminal fine. Pharmacia & Upjohn, a Pfizer subsidiary, violated the United States Food, Drug and Cosmetic Act for misbranding Bextra "with the intent to defraud or mislead."

A water-soluble and injectable prodrug of valdecoxib, parecoxib, is marketed in the European Union under the tradename Dynastat.

== Uses until 2005 ==
In the United States, the FDA approved valdecoxib for the treatment of osteoarthritis, adult rheumatoid arthritis, and primary dysmenorrhea.

Valdecoxib was also used off-label for controlling acute pain and various types of surgical pain.

== Side effects and withdrawal from market ==
On April 7, 2005, Pfizer withdrew Bextra from the U.S. market on recommendation by the FDA, citing an increased risk of heart attack and stroke and also the risk of a serious, sometimes fatal, skin reaction. This was a result of recent attention to prescription NSAIDs, such as Merck's Vioxx. Other reported side effects were angina and Stevens–Johnson syndrome.

Pfizer first acknowledged cardiovascular risks associated with Bextra in October 2004. The American Heart Association soon after was presented with a report indicating patients using Bextra while recovering from heart surgery were 2.19 times more likely to suffer a stroke or heart attack than those taking placebos.

In a large study published in The Journal of the American Medical Association in 2006, valdecoxib appeared less adverse for renal (kidney) disease and heart arrhythmia compared to Vioxx, but elevated renal risks were slightly suggested.

== 2009 settlement for off-label uses promotions ==
On September 2, 2009, the United States Department of Justice fined Pfizer $2.3 billion after one of its subsidiaries, Pharmacia & Upjohn Company, pleaded guilty to marketing four drugs, including Bextra, "with the intent to defraud or mislead." Pharmacia & Upjohn admitted to criminal conduct in the promotion of Bextra, and agreed to pay the largest criminal fine ever imposed in the United States for any matter, $1.195 billion. A former Pfizer district sales manager was indicted and sentenced to home confinement for destroying documents regarding the illegal promotion of Bextra. In addition, a regional manager pleaded guilty to distribution of a misbranded product, and was fined $75,000 and 24 months on probation.

The remaining $1 billion of the fine were paid to resolve allegations under the civil False Claims Act case and is the largest civil fraud settlement against a pharmaceutical company. Six whistleblowers were awarded more than $102 million for their role in the investigation. Former Pfizer sales representative John Kopchinski acted as a qui tam relator and filed a complaint in 2004 outlining the illegal conduct in the marketing of Bextra. Kopchinski was awarded $51.5 million for his role in the case because the improper marketing of Bextra was the largest piece of the settlement at $1.8 billion.

== Analytical methods ==
Several HPLC-UV methods have been reported for valdecoxib estimation in biological samples like human urine. Valdecoxib has analytical methods for bioequivalence studies, metabolite determination, estimation of formulation, and an HPTLC method for simultaneous estimation in tablet dosage form.

== See also ==
- Discovery and development of cyclooxygenase 2 inhibitors
- Parecoxib
- Apricoxib
