= Cyclooxygenase-2 inhibitor =

Type of nonsteroidal anti-inflammatory drug

Cyclooxygenase-2 inhibitors (COX-2 inhibitors; also known as coxibs) are a type of nonsteroidal anti-inflammatory drug (NSAID) that directly target cyclooxygenase-2 (COX-2), an enzyme responsible for inflammation and pain. Targeting selectivity for COX-2 reduces the risk of peptic ulceration and is the main feature of celecoxib, rofecoxib, and other members of this drug class.

After several COX-2–inhibiting drugs were approved for marketing, data from clinical trials revealed that COX-2 inhibitors caused a significant increase in heart attacks and strokes, with some drugs in the class having worse risks than others. Rofecoxib (sold under the brand name Vioxx) was taken off the market in 2004 because of these concerns, while celecoxib (sold under the brand name Celebrex) and traditional NSAIDs received boxed warnings on their labels. Many COX-2–specific inhibitors have been removed from the US market. As of December 2011, only Celebrex (celecoxib) is still available for purchase in the United States. In the European Union, celecoxib, parecoxib, and etoricoxib have been approved for use by the European Medicines Agency.

Paracetamol (acetaminophen) inhibits COX-2 almost exclusively within the brain and only minimally in the rest of the body, although it is not considered an NSAID, since it has only minor anti-inflammatory activity.

== Medical uses ==
Some COX-2 inhibitors are used in a single dose to treat pain after surgery. In this role etoricoxib appears as good as, if not better than, other pain medications, and celecoxib appears to be about as useful as ibuprofen.

NSAIDs are often used in treatment of acute gout attacks. COX-2 inhibitors appear to work as well as nonselective NSAIDs, such as aspirin. They have not been compared to other treatment options such as colchicine or glucocorticoids.

=== Cancer ===
COX-2 appears to be related to cancers and abnormal growths in the intestinal tract. Overexpression of COX-2 produces excess prostaglandins, which have been shown to increase the possibility of colorectal cancer. COX inhibitors have been shown to reduce the occurrence of cancers and precancerous growths. The National Cancer Institute has done some studies on COX-2 and cancer. COX-2 can act as an anti-tumor enzyme, but only in specific cases. The FDA has approved Celebrex for treatment of familial adenomatous polyposis (FAP). COX-2 inhibitors are currently being studied in breast cancer and appear to be beneficial.

=== Neuropsychiatric disorders ===
COX-2 inhibitors have been found to be effective in suppressing inflammatory neurodegenerative pathways, with beneficial results in animal studies for major depressive disorder, as well as schizophrenia, bipolar disorder, and obsessive-compulsive disorder. These need to be confirmed in human clinical trials. Current studies support an association of disorders such as these with chronic inflammation, which appears to decrease with the use of COX-2 inhibitors.

=== Other targets ===
The inhibition of COX-2 is paramount for the anti-inflammatory and analgesic function of the selective COX-2 inhibitor celecoxib. However, with regard to this drug's promise for the therapy of advanced cancers, it is unclear whether the inhibition of COX-2 plays a dominant role, and this has become a controversial and intensely researched issue. In recent years, several additional intracellular components (besides COX-2) were discovered that appear to be important for mediating the anticancer effects of celecoxib in the absence of COX-2. Moreover, a recent study with various malignant tumor cells showed that celecoxib could inhibit the growth of these cells, even though some of these cancer cells didn't even contain COX-2.

Additional support for the idea that other targets besides COX-2 are important for celecoxib's anticancer effects has come from studies with chemically modified versions of celecoxib. Several dozen analogs of celecoxib were generated with small alterations in their chemical structures. Some of these analogs retained COX-2 inhibitory activity, whereas many others didn't. However, when the ability of all these compounds to kill tumor cells in cell culture was investigated, it turned out that the antitumor potency did not at all depend on whether or not the respective compound could inhibit COX-2, showing that inhibition of COX-2 was not required for the anticancer effects. One of these compounds, 2,5-dimethyl-celecoxib, which entirely lacks the ability to inhibit COX-2, actually turned out to display stronger anticancer activity than celecoxib itself and this anticancer effect could also be verified in highly drug-resistant tumor cells and in various animal tumor models.

=== Adverse effects ===
Analysis of clinical trial data revealed that there was a significant increase in the rate of vascular events like myocardial infarction or stroke with COX-2 inhibitors compared with placebo. These results led Merck to voluntarily withdraw rofecoxib from the market in September 2004 and to regulatory authorities imposing a boxed warning on the label of celecoxib. Traditional NSAIDs were also found to have cardiovascular risks, leading to similar boxed warnings.

The cause of the cardiovascular problems became, and remains, a subject of intensive research. As of 2012 results have been converging on the hypothesis that the adverse cardiovascular effects are most likely due to inhibition of COX-2 in blood vessels, which leads to a decrease in the production of prostacyclin in them. Prostacyclin usually prevents platelet aggregation and vasoconstriction, so its inhibition can lead to excess clot formation and higher blood pressure.

== Research ==
=== Research history ===
The COX-2 enzyme was discovered in 1988 by Daniel Simmons, a Brigham Young University researcher. The mouse COX-2 gene was cloned by UCLA scientist Harvey Herschman, a finding published in 1991.

The basic research leading to the discovery of COX-2 inhibitors has been the subject of at least two lawsuits. Brigham Young University has sued Pfizer, alleging breach of contract from relations BYU had with the company at the time of Simmons's work. A settlement was reached in April 2012 in which Pfizer agreed to pay $450 million. The other litigation is based on United States Pat. No. 6,048,850 owned by University of Rochester, which claimed a method to treat pain without causing gastro-intestinal distress by selectively inhibiting COX-2. When the patent issued, the university sued Searle (later Pfizer) in a case called, University of Rochester v. G.D. Searle & Co., 358 F.3d 916 (Fed. Cir. 2004). The court ruled in favor of Searle in 2004, holding in essence that the university had claimed a method requiring, yet provided no written description of, a compound that could inhibit COX-2 and therefore the patent was invalid.

In the course of the search for a specific inhibitor of the negative effects of prostaglandins that spared the positive effects, it was discovered that prostaglandins could indeed be separated into two general classes that could loosely be regarded as "good prostaglandins" and "bad prostaglandins", according to the structure of a particular enzyme involved in their biosynthesis, cyclooxygenase.

Prostaglandins whose synthesis involves the cyclooxygenase-I enzyme, or COX-1, are responsible for maintenance and protection of the gastrointestinal tract, while prostaglandins whose synthesis involves the cyclooxygenase-II enzyme, or COX-2, are responsible for inflammation and pain.

The existing nonsteroidal anti-inflammatory drugs (NSAIDs) differ in their relative specificities for COX-2 and COX-1; while aspirin and ibuprofen inhibit COX-2 and COX-1 enzymes, other NSAIDs appear to have partial COX-2 specificity, particularly meloxicam (Mobic). Aspirin is ≈170-fold more potent in inhibiting COX-1 than COX-2. Studies of meloxicam 7.5 mg per day for 23 days find a level of gastric injury similar to that of a placebo, and for meloxicam 15 mg per day a level of injury lower than that of other NSAIDs; however, in clinical practice meloxicam can still cause some ulcer complications.

Valdecoxib and rofecoxib were about 300 times more potent at inhibiting COX-2 than COX-1, but too toxic for the heart, suggesting the possibility of relief from pain and inflammation without gastrointestinal irritation, and promising to be a boon for those who had previously experienced adverse effects or had comorbidities that could lead to such complications. Celecoxib is approximately 30 times more potent at inhibiting COX-2 than COX-1, with etoricoxib being 106 times more potent.

=== Research fraud ===
Between 1996 and 2009, Scott Reuben purportedly conducted clinical research on the use of COX-2 inhibitors, often in combination with gabapentin or pregabalin, for the prevention and treatment of postoperative pain, research which was found in 2009 to have been faked. Reuben pleaded guilty, paid fines, and served six months in jail, and lost his medical license. A 2009 review of meta-articles used in evidence-based medicine found that while some reviews were no longer valid when the Reuben studies were removed, the conclusions in the majority of them remained unchanged. The review found that the key Reuben claims that needed to be re-examined were "the absence of detrimental effects of coxibs on bone healing after spine surgery, the beneficial long-term outcome after preemptive administration of coxibs including an allegedly decreased incidence of chronic pain after surgery, and the analgesic efficacy of ketorolac or clonidine when added to local anesthetics for intravenous regional anesthesia."

=== Early COX-2-inhibiting drugs ===
Celebrex (and other brand names for celecoxib) was introduced in 1999 and rapidly became the most frequently prescribed new drug in the United States. By October 2000, its US sales exceeded 100 million prescriptions per year for $3 billion, and was still rising. Sales of Celebrex alone reached $3.1 billion in 2001. A Spanish study found that between January 2000 and June 2001, 7% of NSAID prescriptions and 29% of NSAID expenditures were for COX-2 inhibitors. Over the period of the study, COX-2 inhibitors rose from 10.03% of total NSAIDs prescribed by specialty physicians to 29.79%, and from 1.52% to 10.78% of NSAIDs prescribed by primary care physicians (98.23% of NSAIDs and 94.61% of COX-2 inhibitors were prescribed by primary care physicians). For specialty physicians, rofecoxib and celecoxib were third and fifth most frequently prescribed NSAIDs but first and second in cost, respectively; for primary-care physicians they were ninth and twelfth most frequently prescribed NSAIDs and first and fourth in cost.

Sales and marketing efforts were supported by two large trials, the Celecoxib Long-term Arthritis Safety Study (CLASS) in JAMA, and the Vioxx Gastrointestinal Outcomes Research (VIGOR). The VIGOR trial was later proven to have been based on faulty data, and Vioxx was eventually withdrawn from the market.

==== VIGOR study and publishing controversy ====
The VIGOR (Vioxx Gastrointestinal Outcomes Research) trial, "which was the making of Merck's drug rofecoxib (Vioxx)," was at the center of a dispute about the ethics of medical journals. In the VIGOR trial, over 8,000 patients were randomized to receive either naproxen or rofecoxib (Vioxx). Both studies concluded that COX-2 specific NSAIDs were associated with significantly fewer adverse gastrointestinal effects. In the CLASS trial which compared Celebrex 800 mg/day to ibuprofen 2400 mg/day and diclofenac 150 mg/day for osteoarthritis or rheumatoid arthritis for six months, Celebrex was associated with significantly fewer upper gastrointestinal complications (0.44% vs. 1.27%, p = 0.04), with no significant difference in incidence of cardiovascular events in patients not taking aspirin for cardiovascular prophylaxis.

The VIGOR trial results were published in 2000 in the New England Journal of Medicine Bombardier and her research team claimed that there was "an increase in myocardial infarction in the patients given rofecoxib (0.4%) compared with those given naproxen (0.1%)" and "patients given naproxen experienced 121 side effects compared with 56 in the patients taking rofecoxib," a "marvellous result for Merck" which "contributed to huge sales of rofecoxib." Merck's scientists incorrectly interpreted the finding as a protective effect of naproxen, telling the FDA that the difference in heart attacks "is primarily due to" this protective effect. In September 2001, the United States Food and Drug Administration (FDA) sent a warning letter to the CEO of Merck, stating, "Your promotional campaign discounts the fact that in the VIGOR study, patients on Vioxx were observed to have a four to five fold increase in myocardial infarctions (MIs) compared to patients on the comparator nonsteroidal anti-inflammatory drug (NSAID), Naprosyn (naproxen)." This led to the introduction, in April 2002, of warnings on Vioxx labeling concerning the increased risk of cardiovascular events (heart attack and stroke). By 2005 The New England Journal of Medicine published an editorial accusing the Bombardier et al. of deliberately withholding data.

Claire Bombardier, a University of Toronto rheumatologist, had claimed that the VIGOR trial showed that Vioxx 50 mg/day had benefits over naproxen for rheumatoid arthritis, specifically that Vioxx reduced the risk of symptomatic ulcers and clinical upper gastrointestinal events (perforations, obstructions and bleeding) by 54%, to 1.4% from 3%, the risk of complicated upper gastrointestinal events (complicated perforations, obstructions and bleeding in the upper gastrointestinal tract) by 57%, and the risk of bleeding from anywhere in the gastrointestinal tract by 62%. An enormous marketing effort capitalized on these publications; Vioxx was the most heavily advertised prescription drug in 2000, and Celebrex the seventh, according to IMS Health.

=== Neuroblastomas ===
Small tumors of the sympathetic nervous system (neuroblastoma) appear to have abnormal levels of COX-2 expressed. These studies report that overexpression of the COX-2 enzyme has an adverse effect on the tumor suppressor, p53. p53 is an apoptosis transcription factor normally found in the cytosol. When cellular DNA is damaged beyond repair, p53 is transported to the nucleus where it promotes p53 mediated apoptosis. Two of the metabolites of COX-2, prostaglandin A2 (PGA2) and A1 (PGA1), when present in high quantities, bind to p53 in the cytosol and inhibit its ability to cross into the nucleus. This essentially sequesters p53 in the cytosol and prevents apoptosis. Coxibs such as Celebrex (celecoxib), by selectively inhibiting the overexpressed COX-2, allow p53 to work properly. Functional p53 allows DNA damaged neuroblastoma cells to induce apoptosis, halting tumor growth.

COX-2 up-regulation has also been linked to the phosphorylation and activation of the E3 ubiquitin ligase HDM2, a protein that mediates p53 ligation and tagged destruction, through ubiquitination. The mechanism for this neuroblastoma HDM2 hyperactivity is unknown. Studies have shown that COX-2 inhibitors block the phosphorylation of HDM2 preventing its activation. In vitro, the use of COX-2 inhibitors lowers the level of active HDM2 found in neuroblastoma cells. The exact process of how COX-2 inhibitors block HDM2 phosphorylation is unknown, but this mediated reduction in active HDM2 concentration level restores the cellular p53 levels. After treatment with a COX-2 inhibitor, the restored p53 function allows DNA damaged neuroblastoma cells to commit suicide through apoptosis reducing the size of growth of the tumor.
