= List of SJS-inducing substances =

This is a list of drugs and substances that are known or suspected to cause Stevens–Johnson syndrome.

Name	Other names
Allopurinol	
Amoxicillin	
Ampicillin	
Azithromycin	Zithromax
Barbiturates	
Carbamazepine	
Ciprofloxacin/levofloxacin/Gemifloxacin	
Clozapine	Clozaril
Cotrimoxazole	Trimethoprim/sulfamethoxazole
Diclofenac	
Ethosuximide	
Glutathione	
Ibuprofen	
Isotretinoin	Accutane
Lamotrigine	Lamictal
Methazolamide	Neptazane
Modafinil	Provigil
Nevirapine	
Norfloxacin	
Oseltamivir	
Oxicams	Ampiroxicam, Piroxicam, Tenoxicam, Droxicam, Lornoxicam, Meloxicam, Isoxicam
Paracetamol	Acetaminophen, Panadol, Tylenol
Penicillins	
Phenytoin	
Rivoraxaban	Xarelto
Sulfonamides	
Tetracycline	
