= Prostaglandin antagonist =

A prostaglandin antagonist is a hormone antagonist acting upon one or more prostaglandins, a subclass of eicosanoid compounds which function as signaling molecules in numerous types of animal tissues.

NSAIDs are perhaps the best-known prostaglandin antagonists; they suppress the signaling function of prostaglandins, which are important mediators of pain, fever, and inflammation responses, by inhibiting the cyclooxygenase enzymes and thereby reducing prostaglandin synthesis. Corticosteroids inhibit phospholipase A_{2} production by boosting production of lipocortin, an inhibitor protein. Relatively new NSAIDs, known as COX-2 selective inhibitors or coxibs, are used as specific inhibitors of the COX-2 isoform of cyclooxygenase. The development of these drugs allowed the circumvention of the negative gastrointestinal side effects of NSAIDs while still effectively reducing inflammation.

Prostaglandin antagonists may also help with allergies, primarily seasonal allergies or nasal allergies. The prostaglandin D_{2} (PGD_{2}) receptor is activated when it comes into contact with PGD_{2} which is released in the presence of allergens. A research study has been conducted to find an antagonist to the PGD_{2} receptor, DP1, to possibly treat congestion. ONO-4053 is an antagonist that was used on dogs to help with allergic rhinitis caused by PGD_{2}. The study showed that ONO-4053 given either orally or through IV greatly helped increase nasal volume and possibly relieve rhinorrhea by blocking the PGD_{2} receptor before it can be activated by PGD_{2}.

Similarly, to how PGD_{2} antagonists can minimizing symptoms caused by allergies, prostaglandin E_{2} (PGE_{2}) antagonists can also decrease inflammation, swelling, and pain caused by osteoarthritis. A study was made to see the effect of grapiprant, a prostaglandin EP4 receptor antagonist, which uses allosteric inhibition to prevent PGE_{2} to bind to its receptor as opposed to generally blocking viable receptors such as prostaglandin endoperoxide synthase or cyclooxygenase. Studies have shown that grapiprant can be used to treat pain and inflammation similar to NSAIDs that are prescribed to dogs with osteoarthritis. NSAIDs interfere with the cyclooxygenase and levels of various chemical mediators which may lead to a disruption in the body’s homeostasis. Grapiprant is able to selectively bind to only the EP4 receptor and minimize any adverse reactions that may occur.

== Adverse effects ==
NSAIDs have been shown to increase the risk of myocardial infarction when taken on a chronic basis for at least 18 months. One emerging hypothesis that may explain these cardiovascular effects is that coxibs create an imbalance in circulating TxA2 (thromboxane A2) and PGI2 (prostacyclin) levels. An increase in the ratio of TxA2/PGI2 could lead to increased platelet aggregation and dysregulation of platelet homeostasis.

The GI and renal systems of patients who are treated with NSAIDS for a long period of time may experience unwanted side effects compared to patients who are treated for shorter durations. Studies on NSAIDS have shown that it can cause acute kidney injury by inhibiting prostaglandin production. The decreased levels of prostaglandins increases the risks of interstitial nephritis since there is lower blood flow to the kidneys. However, the risks of NSAIDs induced kidney failure is higher in people with diabetes or cardiovascular disease.

A study on grapiprant showed that it negatively impacted the GI system, but the response was mild enough for the owners to not seek medical attention or removal from the trial. In contrast, prolonged use of NSAIDs has shown to increase the risk of toxicity of multiple organs like the GI tract, kidneys, and liver.

== See also ==
- Mechanism of action of aspirin
