= C14H13N3O5S =

The molecular formula C_{14}H_{13}N_{3}O_{5}S (molar mass: 335.335 g/mol, exact mass: 335.0576 u) may refer to:

- Isoxicam
- Sulfanitran
