= Bupivacaine/meloxicam =

Combination drug

Combination of
- Bupivacaine: Local anesthetic
- Meloxicam: Nonsteroidal anti-inflammatory drug (NSAID)

Clinical data
- Trade names: Zynrelef
- Other names: HTX-011
- License data: EU EMA: by INN; US DailyMed: Bupivacaine_and_meloxicam
- Routes of administration: Intralesional, infiltration
- ATC code: N01BB59 (WHO)

Legal status
- Legal status: US: ℞-only; EU: Rx-only

Identifiers
- CAS Number: 2561486-80-2
- KEGG: D12270

Bupivacaine/meloxicam, sold under the brand name Zynrelef, is a fixed-dose combination medication used to treat pain in small to medium-sized wounds after surgery. It contains bupivacaine and meloxicam.

The most common side effects of bupivacaine/meloxicam are dizziness, constipation, vomiting, and headache.

It was authorized for medical use in the European Union in September 2020, and approved in the United States in May 2021.

== Medical uses ==
In the European Union, the combination bupivacaine/meloxicam is indicated for treatment of somatic postoperative pain from small- to medium-sized surgical wounds in adults.

In the United States it is indicated for soft tissue or periarticular instillation to produce postsurgical analgesia for up to 72 hours after bunionectomy, open inguinal herniorrhaphy, and total knee arthroplasty in adults.
