= Oxicam =

Drug class

Piroxicam, the most popular drug of the oxicam class.

Oxicam is a class of non-steroidal anti-inflammatory drugs (NSAIDs), meaning that they have anti-inflammatory, analgesic, and antipyretic therapeutic effects. Oxicams bind closely to plasma proteins. Most oxicams are unselective inhibitors of the cyclooxygenase (COX) enzymes. The exception is meloxicam with a slight (10:1) preference for COX-2, which, however, is only clinically relevant at low doses.

The most popular drug of the oxicam class is piroxicam. Other examples include: ampiroxicam, droxicam, pivoxicam, tenoxicam, lornoxicam, and meloxicam.

Isoxicam has been suspended as a result of fatal skin reactions.

== Chemistry ==
The physico-chemical characteristics of these molecules vary greatly depending upon the environment.

In contrast to most other NSAIDs, oxicams are not carboxylic acids. They are tautomeric, and can exist as a number of tautomers (keto-enol tautomerism), here exemplified by piroxicam:

== Side effects ==
The use of NSAIDs can, rarely, trigger severe cutaneous adverse reactions such as Stevens–Johnson syndrome (SJS) and toxic epidermal necrolysis (TEN). Epidemiologic studies and reviews have reported that, among NSAIDs, the oxicam derivatives (e.g., piroxicam, tenoxicam, meloxicam) are associated with a comparatively higher risk of SJS/TEN, particularly early after starting treatment, although the absolute risk remains low.

Isoxicam was withdrawn/suspended from marketing after reports of fatal skin reactions.
