= Nabumetone =

NSAID analgesic and anti-inflammatory drug

Clinical data
- Trade names: Relafen
- AHFS/Drugs.com: Monograph
- MedlinePlus: a692022
- License data: US DailyMed: Nabumetone
- Routes of administration: By mouth
- ATC code: M01AX01 (WHO)

Legal status
- Legal status: AU: S4 (Prescription only); UK: POM (Prescription only); US: ℞-only

Pharmacokinetic data
- Protein binding: > 99% (active metabolite)
- Metabolism: Liver, to active metabolite 6-methoxy-2-naphthylacetic acid; 6-MNA
- Elimination half-life: 23 hours (active metabolite)
- Excretion: Kidney

Identifiers
- IUPAC name: 4-(6-methoxy-2-naphthyl)-2-butanone
- CAS Number: 42924-53-8
- PubChem CID: 4409
- IUPHAR/BPS: 7245
- DrugBank: DB00461
- ChemSpider: 4256
- UNII: LW0TIW155Z
- KEGG: D00425
- ChEBI: CHEBI:7443
- ChEMBL: ChEMBL1070
- CompTox Dashboard (EPA): DTXSID4045472
- ECHA InfoCard: 100.169.752

Chemical and physical data
- Formula: C_{15}H_{16}O_{2}
- Molar mass: 228.291 g·mol^{−1}
- 3D model (JSmol): Interactive image
- SMILES: O=C(C)CCc1ccc2c(c1)ccc(OC)c2
- InChI: InChI=1S/C15H16O2/c1-11(16)3-4-12-5-6-14-10-15(17-2)8-7-13(14)9-12/h5-10H,3-4H2,1-2H3; Key:BLXXJMDCKKHMKV-UHFFFAOYSA-N

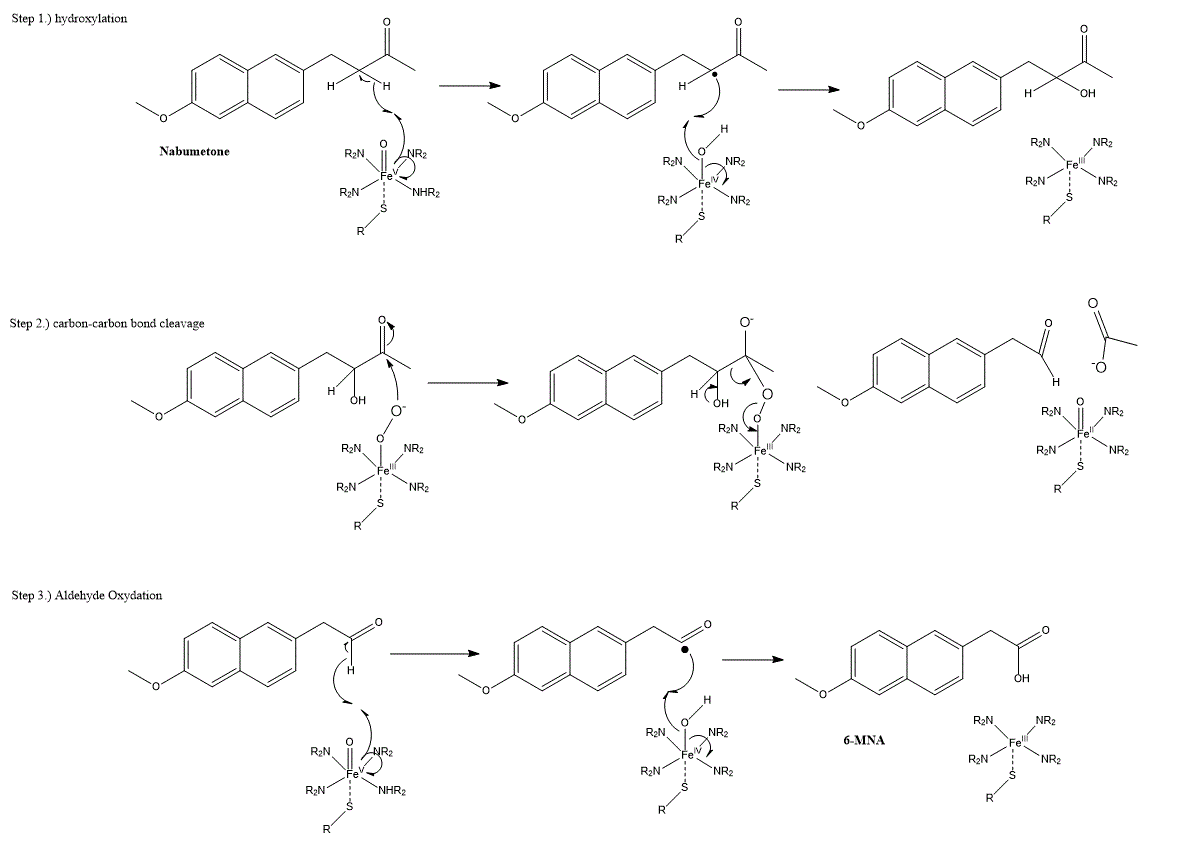
Three step CYP1A2 Mediated Metabolism of the prodrug Nabumetone to its active metabolite 6-MNA.

Nabumetone, sold under the brand name Relafen among others, is a nonsteroidal anti-inflammatory drug (NSAID). Nabumetone was developed by Beecham and first received regulatory approval in 1991.

Nabumetone is a non-acidic NSAID prodrug that is rapidly metabolized in the liver to the active metabolite, 6-methoxy-2-naphthyl acetic acid. Nabumetone's active metabolite inhibits the cyclooxygenase enzyme and preferentially blocks COX-2 activity (which is indirectly responsible for the production of inflammation and pain during arthritis). The active metabolite of nabumetone is felt to be the compound primarily responsible for therapeutic effect. Comparatively, the parent drug is a poor inhibitor of COX-2 byproducts, particularly prostaglandins. It may be less nephrotoxic than indomethacin. There are two known polymorphs of the compound. Nabumetone has little effect on renal prostaglandin secretion and less of an association with heart failure than other traditional drugs of the class. Effects of nabumetone on blood pressure control in hypertensive patients on ACE inhibitors are also good, equivalent to paracetamol.

In 2023, it was the 271st most commonly prescribed medication in the United States, with more than 800,000 prescriptions.

== Medical uses ==
Nabumetone is indicated for relief of signs and symptoms of osteoarthritis and rheumatoid arthritis.

== Side effects ==
Side effects include bloody or black, tarry stools; change in color, frequency, or amount of urine; chest pain; shortness of breath; coughing up blood; pale stools; numbness; weakness; flu-like symptoms; leg pain; vision problems; speech problems; problems walking; weight gain; stomach pain; cold sweat; skin rash; blisters; headache; swelling; bleeding; bruising; vomiting blood; jaundice; diarrhea; constipation; dizziness; indigestion; gas; nausea; and ringing in the ears.

In October 2020, the US Food and Drug Administration (FDA) required the prescribing information to be updated for all nonsteroidal anti-inflammatory medications to describe the risk of kidney problems in unborn babies that result in low amniotic fluid. They recommend avoiding NSAIDs in pregnant women at 20 weeks or later in pregnancy.

== Society and culture ==
=== Brand names ===
It is sold under many brand names, including Relafen, Relifex, and Gambaran.
