= Tenoxicam =

Non-steroidal anti-inflammatory drug

Clinical data
- Trade names: Mobiflex, Tilcotil, others
- AHFS/Drugs.com: International Drug Names
- Routes of administration: Oral
- ATC code: M01AC02 (WHO)

Legal status
- Legal status: AU: S4 (Prescription only); UK: POM (Prescription only)

Pharmacokinetic data
- Protein binding: High
- Elimination half-life: 30–140 hours

Identifiers
- IUPAC name: 4-hydroxy-2-methyl-N-(pyridin-2-yl)-1λ^{6}-thieno[2,3-e][1,2]thiazine-3-carboxamide-1,1-dioxide
- CAS Number: 59804-37-4
- PubChem CID: 5282194
- DrugBank: DB00469
- ChemSpider: 4471584
- UNII: Z1R9N0A399
- KEGG: D01767
- ChEBI: CHEBI:32192
- CompTox Dashboard (EPA): DTXSID8045486
- ECHA InfoCard: 100.149.365

Chemical and physical data
- Formula: C_{13}H_{11}N_{3}O_{4}S_{2}
- Molar mass: 337.37 g·mol^{−1}
- 3D model (JSmol): Interactive image
- Melting point: 209 to 213 °C (408 to 415 °F) (dec.)
- SMILES: CN1C(C(=O)Nc2ccccn2)=C(O)c2sccc2S1(=O)=O
- InChI: InChI=1S/C13H11N3O4S2/c1-16-10(13(18)15-9-4-2-3-6-14-9)11(17)12-8(5-7-21-12)22(16,19)20/h2-7,17H,1H3,(H,14,15,18); Key:LZNWYQJJBLGYLT-UHFFFAOYSA-N

Tenoxicam, sold under the brand name Mobiflex among others, is a nonsteroidal anti-inflammatory drug (NSAID). It is used to relieve inflammation, swelling, stiffness, and pain associated with rheumatoid arthritis, osteoarthritis, ankylosing spondylitis (a type of arthritis involving the spine), tendinitis (inflammation of a tendon), bursitis (inflammation of a bursa, a fluid-filled sac located around joints and near the bones), and periarthritis of the shoulders or hips (inflammation of tissues surrounding these joints).

Tenoxicam belongs to the class of NSAIDs known as oxicams.

It was patented in 1974 by Roche and approved for medical use in 1987. It is available as a prescription-only drug in the United Kingdom and other countries, but not in the US. Outside the United Kingdom, tenoxicam is also marketed under brand names including Tilatil, Tilcitin, and Alganex.

== Contraindications ==
The drug is contraindicated for patients who are seniors who have been given anesthesia or surgery; are at risk of increased bleeding or kidney failure; have an active inflammatory disease involving the stomach or intestine (like ulcerative colitis); have an active stomach or intestinal ulcer; have had an acute asthmatic attack, hives, rhinitis (inflammation of the inner lining of the nasal passage), or other allergic reactions caused by aspirin or other nonsteroidal anti-inflammatory drugs (for example diclofenac, ibuprofen, indomethacin, naproxen).

Common side effects that have been observed with tenoxicam include peptic ulceration, dyspepsia, nausea, constipation, abdominal pain, diarrhea, rash, headache, edema, renal failure, and vertigo. In rare cases, tenoxicam and other NSAIDs can contribute to thrombotic events, Stevens-Johnson Syndrome, and toxic epidermal necrolysis.

=== Pregnancy and breastfeeding ===
It is not recommended that women who are trying to conceive, who are pregnant, or who are breastfeeding take tenoxicam. Tenoxicam can be taken in the first and second trimester when necessary, but it is a contraindication in the third trimester. Some studies have looked at whether or not NSAIDs are able to enter the breast milk and the first few studies have found evidence that NSAIDs can be found in breast milk. Therefore, it is not recommended that women take tenoxicam while breastfeeding.

== Interactions ==
Taking tenoxicam with other drugs can increase the chance of side effects or alter the therapeutic effect of tenoxicam or the other drug, depending on the combination. Drug types the tenoxicam may interact with include: other analgesic NSAIDs, salicylates such as aspirin, antacids, anticoagulants, cardiac glycosides, ciclosporin, quinolone antibiotics, lithium therapy, diuretics and anti-hypertensives, methotrexate, oral anti-diabetics, colestyramine, dextromethorphan, mifepristone, corticosteroids, anti-platelet agents and selective serotonin reuptake inhibitors (SSRIs), tacrolimus, zidovudine, and gold/penicillamine.

== Mechanism of action ==
Like all NSAIDs, the exact mechanism of action of tenoxicam is unknown. Involved in the mechanism of action is inhibition of cyclooxygenase (COX-1 and COX-2) which leads to the potential adverse effect of increased bleeding.

== Society and culture ==
Tenoxicam is sold in the form of 20 mg tablets with the price of treatment ranging from US$1.29–2.73 per tablet. Recommended dosing calls for tenoxicam to be taken once daily with food. One week is the typical length for treatment, but the treatment length may be extended.

In 2008, the reported sales level for Tilcotil (tenoxicam) was 70 million SEK (approximately US$10.5 million).

== Research ==
The first members of the oxicam family of NSAIDs were brought to market in France in 1982. Shortly thereafter, tenoxicam went to phase III clinical trials for approval as use as an analgesic began in the 1980s. The general consensus from clinical studies is that tenoxicam has about equal analgesic effect as other NSAIDs and does not elicit any important side effects. More recent clinical trials for tenoxicam are examining the use of tenoxicam independently and in combination with other drugs for more specialized analgesic purposes in surgical operations such as third molar extraction and labor pains.

== See also ==
- Piroxicam
- Meloxicam
