= Droxicam =

NSAID analgesic drug

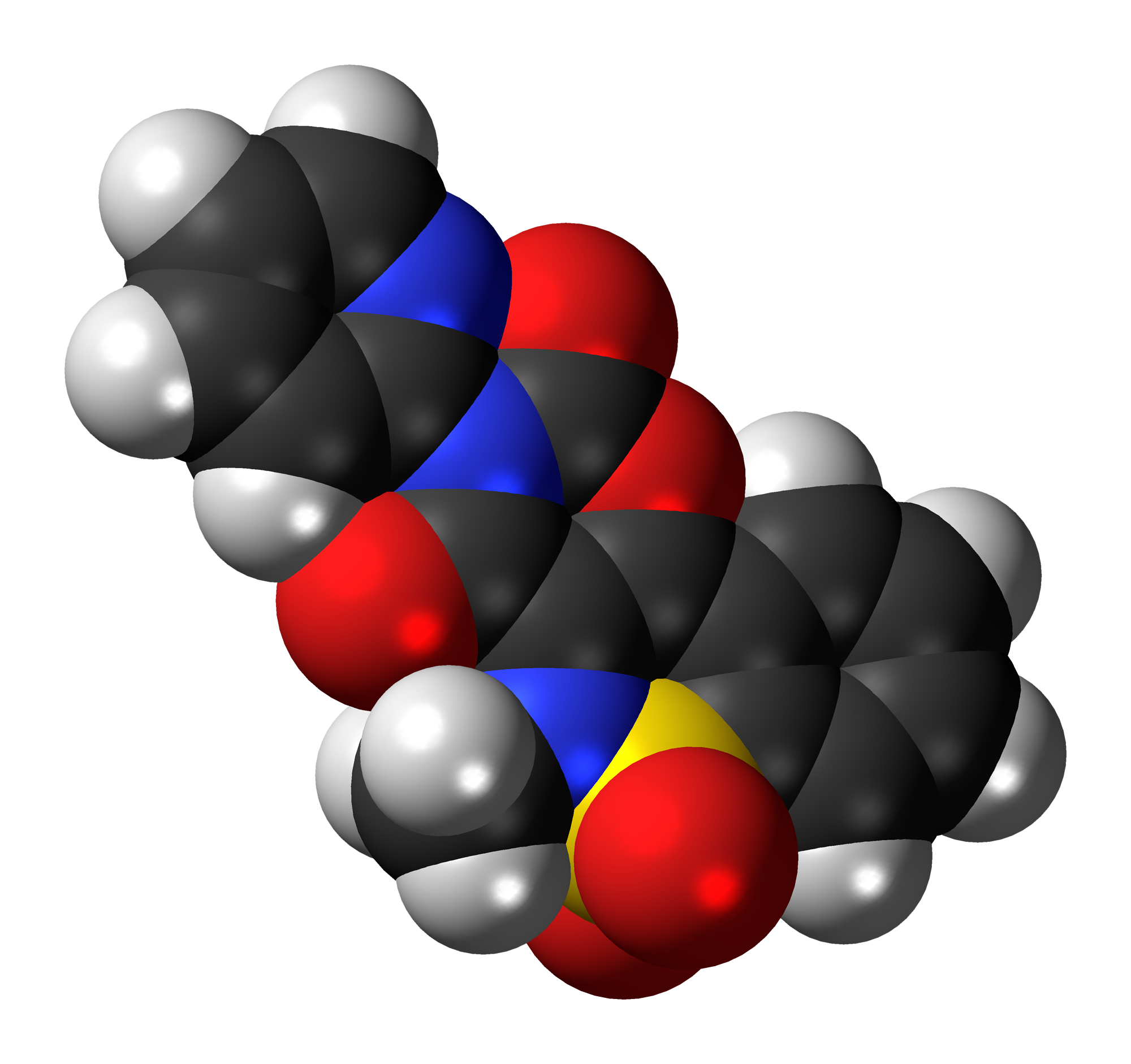

Clinical data
- ATC code: M01AC04 (WHO)

Identifiers
- IUPAC name: 2H,5H-1,3-Oxazino(5,6-c)(1,2)benzothiazine-2,4(3H)-dione, 5-methyl-3-(2-pyridinyl)-, 6,6-dioxide
- CAS Number: 90101-16-9
- PubChem CID: 65679
- ChemSpider: 59108
- UNII: F24ADO1E2D
- KEGG: D07267
- ChEBI: CHEBI:76133
- ChEMBL: ChEMBL1213420
- CompTox Dashboard (EPA): DTXSID70238035

Chemical and physical data
- Formula: C_{16}H_{11}N_{3}O_{5}S
- Molar mass: 357.34 g·mol^{−1}
- 3D model (JSmol): Interactive image
- SMILES: CN1c2c(oc(=O)n(c2=O)c3ccccn3)-c4ccccc4S1(=O)=O
- InChI: InChI=1S/C16H11N3O5S/c1-18-13-14(10-6-2-3-7-11(10)25(18,22)23)24-16(21)19(15(13)20)12-8-4-5-9-17-12/h2-9H,1H3; Key:OEHFRZLKGRKFAS-UHFFFAOYSA-N

Droxicam is a non-steroidal anti-inflammatory drug of the oxicam class. A prodrug of piroxicam, it is used for the relief of pain and inflammation in musculoskeletal disorders such as rheumatoid arthritis and osteoarthritis.

== Synthesis ==

When heated, phenyl pyridin-2-ylcarbamate (1) decomposes to 2-isocyanatopyridine (2) which reacts with the heterocyclic compound (3) to give droxicam.
