= Licofelone =

Analgesic and anti-inflammatory compound

Legal status
- Legal status: Investigational

Identifiers
- IUPAC name: [6-(4-Chlorophenyl)-2,2-dimethyl-7-phenyl-2,3-dihydro-1H-pyrrolizin-5-yl]acetic acid
- CAS Number: 156897-06-2
- PubChem CID: 133021
- ChemSpider: 117391
- UNII: P5T6BYS22Y
- ChEBI: CHEBI:47532
- ChEMBL: ChEMBL52854
- CompTox Dashboard (EPA): DTXSID40166154
- ECHA InfoCard: 100.222.821

Chemical and physical data
- Formula: C_{23}H_{22}ClNO_{2}
- Molar mass: 379.88 g·mol^{−1}
- InChI: InChI=1S/C23H22ClNO2/c1-23(2)13-19-22(15-6-4-3-5-7-15)21(16-8-10-17(24)11-9-16)18(12-20(26)27)25(19)14-23/h3-11H,12-14H2,1-2H3,(H,26,27); Key:UAWXGRJVZSAUSZ-UHFFFAOYSA-N

Licofelone is a dual COX/LOX inhibitor that was studied in clinical trials as a treatment for osteoarthritis and which was under development by Merckle GmbH with partners Alfa Wassermann and Lacer.

Licofelone is both an analgesic and an anti-inflammatory. Inhibition of 5-lipoxygenase (5-LOX) may reduce the gastrointestinal toxicity associated with other nonsteroidal anti-inflammatory drugs (NSAID), which only inhibit cyclooxygenase (COX). Licofelone is the first drug to inhibit both.

Phase III trials for osteoarthritis were conducted in the early 2000s, but results were mixed and the drug has never been submitted for regulatory approval.
