= Nonsteroidal anti-inflammatory drug =

Class of therapeutic drug

- Drug class
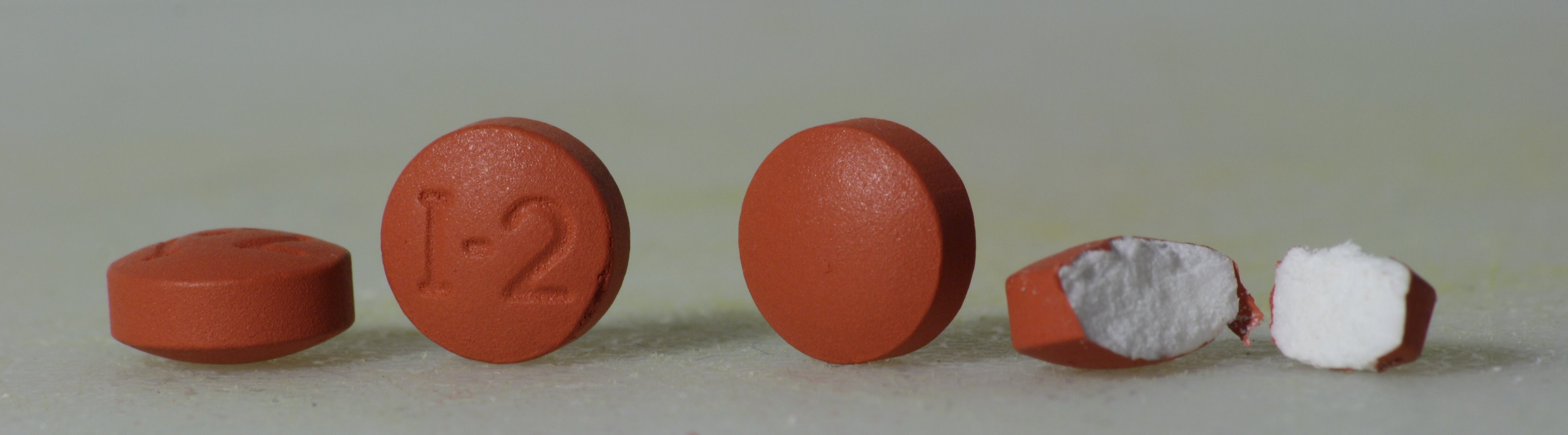
- Film-coated 200 mg tablets of generic ibuprofen, a common nonsteroidal anti-inflammatory drug

Class identifiers
- Pronunciation: /ˈɛnsɛd/ EN-sed
- Synonyms: Cyclooxygenase inhibitor; Cyclooxygenase enzyme inhibitor; Nonsteroidal anti-inflammatory agent/analgesic (NSAIA)
- Use: Pain, fever, inflammation, antithrombosis
- ATC code: M01A
- Mechanism of action: Enzyme inhibitor
- Biological target: COX-1 and COX-2

Legal status

NSAID identification on label of generic ibuprofen, an over-the-counter nonsteroidal anti-inflammatory drug

Nonsteroidal anti-inflammatory drugs (NSAID) are members of a therapeutic drug class which reduces pain, decreases inflammation, decreases fever, and prevents blood clots. Side effects depend on the specific drug, its dose and duration of use, but largely include an increased risk of gastrointestinal ulcers and bleeds, heart attack, and kidney disease. Well-known nonsteroidal anti-inflammatory drugs include aspirin, ibuprofen, diclofenac, and naproxen, all of which are available over the counter (OTC). Paracetamol (acetaminophen) is generally not considered an NSAID because it has only minor anti-inflammatory activity.

The term nonsteroidal, common from around 1960, distinguishes these drugs from corticosteroids, another class of anti-inflammatory drugs, which during the 1950s had acquired a bad reputation due to overuse and side-effect problems after their introduction in 1948.

Nonsteroidal anti-inflammatory drugs work by inhibiting the activity of cyclooxygenase enzymes (the COX-1 and COX-2 isoenzymes). In cells, these enzymes are involved in the synthesis of key biological mediators, namely prostaglandins, which are involved in inflammation, and thromboxanes, which are involved in blood clotting.

Structure of the NSAID Diclofenac

There are two general types of NSAIDs available: non-selective and COX-2 selective. Most NSAIDs are non-selective, and inhibit the activity of both COX-1 and COX-2. These NSAIDs, while reducing inflammation, also inhibit platelet aggregation and increase the risk of gastrointestinal ulcers and bleeds. COX-2 selective inhibitors have fewer gastrointestinal side effects, but promote thrombosis, and some of these agents substantially increase the risk of heart attack. As a result, certain COX-2 selective inhibitors—such as rofecoxib—are no longer used due to the high risk of undiagnosed vascular disease. These differential effects are due to the different roles and tissue localisations of each COX isoenzyme. By inhibiting physiological COX activity, NSAIDs may cause deleterious effects on kidney function, and, perhaps as a result of water and sodium retention and decreases in renal blood flow, may lead to heart problems.

== Medical uses ==
Nonsteroidal anti-inflammatory drugs are often suggested for the treatment of acute or chronic conditions where pain and inflammation are present. Nonsteroidal anti-inflammatory drugs are generally used for the symptomatic relief of the following conditions:

- Osteoarthritis
- Rheumatoid arthritis
- Mild-to-moderate pain due to inflammation and tissue injury
- Low back pain
- Inflammatory arthropathies (e.g., ankylosing spondylitis, psoriatic arthritis, reactive arthritis)
- Tennis elbow
- Headache
- Migraine
- Acute gout
- Dysmenorrhea (menstrual pain)
- Metastatic bone pain
- Postoperative pain
- Muscle stiffness and pain due to Parkinson's disease
- Pyrexia (fever)
- Ileus
- Renal colic
- Macular edema
- Traumatic injury

=== Chronic pain and cancer-related pain ===
The effectiveness of nonsteroidal anti-inflammatory drugs for treating non-cancer chronic pain and cancer-related pain in children and adolescents is not clear. There have not been sufficient numbers of high-quality randomised controlled trials conducted.

=== Inflammation ===
Differences in anti-inflammatory activity between the various individual NSAIDs are small, but there is considerable variation among individual patients in therapeutic response and tolerance to these drugs. About 60% of patients will respond to any NSAID; of the others, those who do not respond to one may well respond to another. Pain relief starts soon after taking the first dose, and a full analgesic effect should normally be obtained within a week, whereas an anti-inflammatory effect may not be achieved (or may not be clinically assessable) for up to three weeks. If appropriate responses are not obtained within these times, another NSAID should be tried.

=== Surgical pain ===
Pain following surgery can be significant, and many people require strong pain medications such as opioids. There is some low-certainty evidence that starting NSAID painkiller medications in adults early, before surgery, may help reduce post-operative pain, and also reduce the dose or quantity of opioid medications required after surgery. Any increased risk of surgical bleeding, bleeding in the gastrointestinal system, myocardial infarctions, or injury to the kidneys has not been well studied. When used in combination with paracetamol, the analgesic effect on post-operative pain may be improved.

=== Aspirin ===
Aspirin, the only NSAID able to irreversibly inhibit COX-1, is also indicated for antithrombosis through inhibition of platelet aggregation. This is useful for the management of arterial thrombosis, and prevention of adverse cardiovascular events like heart attacks. Aspirin inhibits platelet aggregation by inhibiting the action of thromboxane A_{2}.

=== Dentistry ===
Nonsteroidal anti-inflammatory drugs are useful in the management of post-operative dental pain following invasive dental procedures such as dental extraction. When not contra-indicated, they are favoured over the use of paracetamol alone due to the anti-inflammatory effect they provide. There is weak evidence suggesting that taking pre-operative analgesia can reduce the length of post operative pain associated with placing orthodontic spacers under local anaesthetic.

=== Alzheimer's disease ===
Based on observational studies and randomized controlled trials, NSAID use is not effective for the treatment or prevention of Alzheimer's disease.

== Contraindications ==
Nonsteroidal anti-inflammatory drugs may be used with caution by people with the following conditions:

- Persons who are over age 50, and who have a family history of gastrointestinal (GI) problems
- Persons who have had previous gastrointestinal problems from NSAID use

== Adverse effects ==
The widespread use of NSAIDs has meant that the adverse effects of these drugs have become increasingly common. Use of NSAIDs increases the risk of a range of gastrointestinal (GI) problems, kidney disease, and adverse cardiovascular events. As commonly used for post-operative pain, there is evidence of increased risk of kidney complications. Their use following gastrointestinal surgery remains controversial, given mixed evidence of increased risk of leakage from any bowel anastomosis created.

An estimated 10–20% of people taking NSAIDs experience indigestion. In the 1990s, high doses of prescription NSAIDs were associated with serious upper gastrointestinal adverse events, including bleeding.

There is an argument over the benefits and risks of NSAIDs for treating chronic musculoskeletal pain. Each drug has a benefit-risk profile, and balancing the risk of no treatment with the competing potential risks of various therapies should be considered. For people over the age of 65 years old, the balance between the benefits of pain-relief medications such as NSAIDs and the potential for adverse effects has not been well determined.

Side effects are dose-dependent, and in many cases, severe enough to pose the risk of ulcer perforation, upper gastrointestinal bleeding, and death, limiting the use of NSAID therapy. An estimated 10–20% of NSAID patients experience dyspepsia, and NSAID-associated upper gastrointestinal adverse events are estimated to result in 103,000 hospitalizations and 16,500 deaths per year in the United States, and represent 43% of drug-related emergency visits. Many of these events are avoidable; a review of physician visits and prescriptions estimated that unnecessary prescriptions for NSAIDs were written in 42% of visits.

Aspirin should not be taken by people who have salicylate intolerance or a more generalized drug intolerance to NSAIDs, and caution should be exercised in those with asthma or NSAID-precipitated bronchospasm. Owing to its effect on the stomach lining, manufacturers recommend people with peptic ulcers, mild diabetes, or gastritis seek medical advice before using aspirin. Use of aspirin during dengue fever is not recommended owing to increased bleeding tendency. People with kidney disease, hyperuricemia, or gout should not take aspirin because it inhibits the ability of the kidneys to excrete uric acid, and thus may exacerbate these conditions.

=== Combinational risk ===
If a COX-2 inhibitor is taken, a traditional NSAID (prescription or over-the-counter) should not be taken at the same time.

Rofecoxib (Vioxx) was shown to produce significantly fewer gastrointestinal adverse drug reactions (ADRs) compared with naproxen. The study, the VIGOR trial, raised the issue of the cardiovascular safety of the coxibs (COX-2 inhibitors). A statistically significant increase in the incidence of myocardial infarctions was observed in patients on rofecoxib. Further data, from the APPROVe trial, showed a statistically significant relative risk of cardiovascular events of 1.97 versus placebo—which caused a worldwide withdrawal of rofecoxib in October 2004.

=== Cardiovascular ===
NSAIDs, aside from aspirin, increase the risk of myocardial infarction and stroke. This occurs at least within a week of use. They are not recommended in those who have had a previous heart attack as they increase the risk of death or recurrent MI. Evidence indicates that naproxen may be the least harmful out of these.

NSAIDs, aside from (low-dose) aspirin, are associated with a doubled risk of heart failure in people without a history of cardiac disease. In people with such a history, use of NSAIDs (aside from low-dose aspirin) was associated with a more than 10-fold increase in heart failure. If this link is proven causal, researchers estimate that NSAIDs would be responsible for up to 20 percent of hospital admissions for congestive heart failure. In people with heart failure, NSAIDs increase mortality risk (hazard ratio) by approximately 1.2–1.3 for naproxen and ibuprofen, 1.7 for rofecoxib and celecoxib, and 2.1 for diclofenac.

In July 2015, the US Food and Drug Administration (FDA) toughened warnings of increased heart attack and stroke risk associated with nonsteroidal anti-inflammatory drugs (NSAIDs) other than aspirin.

=== Possible erectile dysfunction risk ===
A 2005 Finnish survey study found an association between long-term (over three months) use of NSAIDs and erectile dysfunction.

According to a study published in 2011, men who use NSAIDs regularly are at significantly increased risk of erectile dysfunction. The study was observational and not controlled, with a low original participation rate, potential participation bias, and other uncontrolled factors. The authors warned against drawing any conclusions regarding cause.

=== Gastrointestinal ===
The main adverse drug reactions (ADRs) associated with NSAID use relate to direct and indirect irritation of the gastrointestinal (GI) tract. NSAIDs cause a dual assault on the GI tract: the acidic molecules directly irritate the gastric mucosa, and inhibition of COX-1 and COX-2 reduces the levels of protective prostaglandins. Inhibition of prostaglandin synthesis in the GI tract causes increased gastric acid secretion, diminished bicarbonate secretion, diminished mucus secretion and diminished trophic effects on the epithelial mucosa.

Common gastrointestinal side effects include:

- Nausea or vomiting
- Indigestion
- Gastric ulceration or bleeding
- Diarrhea

Clinical NSAID ulcers are related to the systemic effects of NSAID administration. Such damage occurs irrespective of the route of administration of the NSAID (e.g., oral, rectal, or parenteral) and can occur even in people who have achlorhydria.

Ulceration risk increases with therapy duration and with higher doses. To minimize GI side effects, it is prudent to use the lowest effective dose for the shortest period—a practice that studies show is often not followed. Over 50% of patients on long term NSAID treatments of 6 or more months, sustained some mucosal damage to their small intestine.

The risk and rate of gastric adverse effects are different depending on the type of NSAID medication a person is taking. Indomethacin, ketoprofen, and piroxicam use appears to lead to the highest rate of gastric adverse effects, while ibuprofen (lower doses) and diclofenac appear to have lower rates.

Certain NSAIDs, such as aspirin, have been sold in enteric-coated formulations that manufacturers claim reduce the incidence of gastrointestinal ADRs. Similarly, some believe that rectal formulations may reduce gastrointestinal ADRs. However, consistent with the systemic mechanism of such ADRs, and in clinical practice, these formulations have not demonstrated a reduced risk of GI ulceration.

Numerous "gastro-protective" drugs have been developed to prevent gastrointestinal toxicity in people who need to take NSAIDs regularly. Gastric adverse effects may be reduced by taking medications that suppress acid production such as proton pump inhibitors (e.g.: omeprazole and esomeprazole), or by treatment with a drug that mimics prostaglandin to restore the lining of the GI tract (e.g.: a prostaglandin analog misoprostol). Diarrhea is a common side effect of misoprostol; however, higher doses of misoprostol have been shown to reduce the risk of a person having a complication related to a gastric ulcer while taking NSAIDs. While these techniques may be effective, they are expensive for maintenance therapy.

Hydrogen sulfide NSAID hybrids have been studied as a way of trying to reduce the gastric ulceration/bleeding side effects of NSAIDs. This is motivated by the fact that hydrogen sulfide is known to impact the gastrointestinal system, with either a pro-inflammatory or anti-inflammatory effect depending on the dose. Early results in rats and rabbits have been promising.

=== Renal ===
Nonsteroidal anti-inflammatory drugs are associated with a high incidence of adverse drug reactions (ADRs) on the kidney and over time can lead to chronic kidney disease. The mechanism of these kidney ADRs is due to changes in kidney blood flow. Prostaglandins normally dilate the afferent arterioles of the glomeruli. This helps maintain normal glomerular perfusion and glomerular filtration rate (GFR), an indicator of kidney function. This is particularly important in kidney failure, where the kidney is trying to maintain renal perfusion pressure by elevated angiotensin II levels. At these elevated levels, angiotensin II also constricts the afferent arteriole into the glomerulus in addition to the efferent arteriole it normally constricts. Since NSAIDs block this prostaglandin-mediated effect of afferent arteriole dilation, particularly in kidney failure, NSAIDs cause unopposed constriction of the afferent arteriole and decreased RPF (renal perfusion flow) and GFR.

Common ADRs associated with altered kidney function include:

- Sodium and fluid retention
- Hypertension (high blood pressure)

These agents may also cause kidney impairment, especially in combination with other nephrotoxic agents. Kidney failure is especially a risk if the patient is also concomitantly taking an ACE inhibitor (which removes angiotensin II's vasoconstriction of the efferent arteriole) and a diuretic (which drops plasma volume, and thereby RPF)—the so-called "triple whammy" effect.

Nonsteroidal anti-inflammatory drugs in combination with excessive use of phenacetin or paracetamol (acetaminophen) may lead to analgesic nephropathy.

=== Photosensitivity ===
Photosensitivity is a commonly overlooked adverse effect of many of the NSAIDs. The 2-arylpropionic acids are the most likely to produce photosensitivity reactions, but other NSAIDs have also been implicated including piroxicam, diclofenac, and benzydamine.

Benoxaprofen, since withdrawn due to its liver toxicity, was the most photoactive NSAID observed. The mechanism of photosensitivity, responsible for the high photoactivity of the 2-arylpropionic acids, is the ready decarboxylation of the carboxylic acid moiety. The specific absorbance characteristics of the different chromophoric 2-aryl substituents, affects the decarboxylation mechanism.

=== During pregnancy ===
While NSAIDs as a class are not direct teratogens, use of NSAIDs in late pregnancy can cause premature closure of the fetal ductus arteriosus and kidney ADRs in the fetus. Thus, NSAIDs are not recommended during the third trimester of pregnancy because of the increased risk of premature constriction of the ductus arteriosus. Additionally, they are linked with premature birth and miscarriage. Aspirin, however, is used together with heparin in pregnant women with antiphospholipid syndrome. Additionally, indomethacin can be used in pregnancy to treat polyhydramnios by reducing fetal urine production via inhibiting fetal renal blood flow.

In contrast, paracetamol (acetaminophen) is regarded as being safe and well tolerated during pregnancy, but a study released in 2010, indicated that there may be associated male infertility in the unborn. Doses should be taken as prescribed, due to risk of liver toxicity with overdoses.

In France, the country's health agency contraindicates the use of NSAIDs, including aspirin, after the sixth month of pregnancy.

In October 2020, the US Food and Drug Administration (FDA) required the prescribing information to be updated for all nonsteroidal anti-inflammatory medications, to describe the risk of kidney problems in unborn babies which can then lead to low amniotic fluid levels, as a result of the use of NSAIDs. The FDA recommends avoiding the use of NSAIDs by pregnant women at 20 weeks or later in pregnancy.

=== Allergy and allergy-like hypersensitivity reactions ===
A variety of allergic or allergic-like NSAID hypersensitivity reactions follow the ingestion of NSAIDs. These hypersensitivity reactions differ from the other adverse reactions listed here, which are toxicity reactions, i.e., unwanted reactions that result from the pharmacological action of a drug, are dose-related, and can occur in any treated individual; hypersensitivity reactions are idiosyncratic reactions to a drug. Some NSAID hypersensitivity reactions are truly allergic in origin: 1) repetitive IgE-mediated urticarial skin eruptions, angioedema, and anaphylaxis following immediately to hours after ingesting one structural type of NSAID but not after ingesting structurally unrelated NSAIDs; and 2) Comparatively mild to moderately severe T cell-mediated delayed onset (usually more than 24 hour), skin reactions such as maculopapular rash, fixed drug eruptions, photosensitivity reactions, delayed urticaria, and contact dermatitis; or 3) far more severe and potentially life-threatening t-cell-mediated delayed systemic reactions such as the DRESS syndrome, acute generalized exanthematous pustulosis, the Stevens–Johnson syndrome, and toxic epidermal necrolysis. Other NSAID hypersensitivity reactions are allergy-like symptoms but do not involve true allergic mechanisms; rather, they appear due to the ability of NSAIDs to alter the metabolism of arachidonic acid in favor of forming metabolites that promote allergic symptoms. Affected individuals may be abnormally sensitive to these provocative metabolites or overproduce them and typically are susceptible to a wide range of structurally dissimilar NSAIDs, particularly those that inhibit COX-1. Symptoms, which develop immediately to hours after ingesting any of various NSAIDs that inhibit COX-1, are: 1) exacerbations of asthmatic and rhinitis (see aspirin-exacerbated respiratory disease) symptoms in individuals with a history of asthma or rhinitis and 2) exacerbation or first-time development of wheals or angioedema in individuals with or without a history of chronic urticarial lesions or angioedema.

=== Possible effects on bone and soft tissue healing ===
It has been hypothesized that NSAIDs may delay healing from bone and soft-tissue injuries by inhibiting inflammation. On the other hand, it has also been hypothesized that NSAIDs might speed recovery from soft tissue injuries by preventing inflammatory processes from damaging adjacent, non-injured muscles.

There is moderate evidence that they delay bone healing. Their overall effect on soft-tissue healing is unclear.

=== Ototoxicity ===
Long-term use of NSAID analgesics and paracetamol is associated with an increased risk of hearing loss.

=== Other ===
The use of NSAIDs for analgesia following gastrointestinal surgery remains controversial, given mixed evidence of an increased risk of leakage from any bowel anastomosis created. This risk may vary according to the class of NSAID prescribed.

Common adverse drug reactions (ADR), other than those listed above, include: raised liver enzymes, headache, dizziness. Uncommon ADRs include an abnormally high level of potassium in the blood, confusion, spasm of the airways, and rash. Ibuprofen may also rarely cause irritable bowel syndrome symptoms. NSAIDs are also implicated in some cases of Stevens–Johnson syndrome.

Most NSAIDs penetrate poorly into the central nervous system (CNS). However, the COX enzymes are expressed constitutively in some areas of the CNS, meaning that even limited penetration may cause adverse effects such as somnolence and dizziness.

Nonsteroidal anti-inflammatory drugs may increase the risk of bleeding in patients with Dengue fever For this reason, NSAIDs are only available with a prescription in India.

In very rare cases, ibuprofen can cause aseptic meningitis.

Allergies to NSAIDs might exist. While many allergies are specific to one NSAID, up to 1 in 5 people may have unpredictable cross-reactive allergic responses to other NSAIDs.

== Interactions ==
Nonsteroidal anti-inflammatory drugs reduce kidney blood flow and thereby decrease the efficacy of diuretics, and inhibit the elimination of lithium and methotrexate.

Nonsteroidal anti-inflammatory drugs cause decreased ability to form blood clots, which can increase the risk of bleeding when combined with other drugs that also decrease blood clotting, such as warfarin.

Nonsteroidal anti-inflammatory drugs may aggravate hypertension (high blood pressure) and thereby antagonize the effect of antihypertensives, such as ACE inhibitors.

Nonsteroidal anti-inflammatory drugs may interfere and reduce effectiveness of SSRI antidepressants through inhibiting TNFα and IFNγ, both of which are cytokine derivatives. NSAIDs, when used in combination with SSRIs, increase the risk of adverse gastrointestinal effects. NSAIDs, when used in combination with SSRIs, increase the risk of internal bleeding and brain hemorrhages.

Various widely used NSAIDs enhance endocannabinoid signaling by blocking the anandamide-degrading membrane enzyme fatty acid amide hydrolase (FAAH).

Nonsteroidal anti-inflammatory drugs may reduce the effectiveness of antibiotics. An in-vitro study on cultured bacteria found that adding NSAIDs to antibiotics reduced their effectiveness by around 20%.

The concomitant use of NSAIDs with alcohol and/or tobacco products significantly increases the already elevated risk of peptic ulcers during NSAID therapy.

== Mechanism of action ==
Nonsteroidal anti-inflammatory drugs act as nonselective inhibitors of the cyclooxygenase (COX) enzymes, inhibiting both the cyclooxygenase-1 (COX-1) and cyclooxygenase-2 (COX-2) isoenzymes. This inhibition is competitively reversible (albeit at varying degrees of reversibility), as opposed to the mechanism of aspirin, which is irreversible inhibition. COX catalyzes the formation of prostaglandins and thromboxane from arachidonic acid (itself derived from the cellular phospholipid bilayer by phospholipase A_{2}). Prostaglandins act (among other things) as messenger molecules in the process of inflammation. This mechanism of action was elucidated in 1970 by John Vane (1927–2004), who received a Nobel Prize for his work (see Mechanism of action of aspirin).

COX-1 is a constitutively expressed enzyme with a "house-keeping" role in regulating many normal physiological processes. One of these is in the stomach lining, where prostaglandins serve a protective role, preventing the stomach mucosa from being eroded by its own acid. COX-2 is an enzyme facultatively expressed in inflammation, and it is inhibition of COX-2 that produces the desirable effects of NSAIDs.

When nonselective COX-1/COX-2 inhibitors (such as aspirin, ibuprofen, and naproxen) lower stomach prostaglandin levels, ulcers of the stomach or duodenum and internal bleeding can result. The discovery of COX-2 led to research to the development of selective COX-2 inhibiting drugs that do not cause gastric problems characteristic of older NSAIDs.

Nonsteroidal anti-inflammatory drugs have been studied in various assays to understand how they affect each of these enzymes. While the assays reveal differences, unfortunately, different assays provide differing ratios.

Paracetamol (acetaminophen) is not considered an NSAID because it has little anti-inflammatory activity. It treats pain mainly by blocking COX-2, mostly in the central nervous system, but not much in the rest of the body.

However, many aspects of the mechanism of action of NSAIDs remain unexplained, and for this reason, further COX pathways are hypothesized. The COX-3 pathway was believed to fill some of this gap, but recent findings make it appear unlikely that it plays any significant role in humans, and alternative explanation models are proposed.

Nonsteroidal anti-inflammatory drugs interact with the endocannabinoid system and its endocannabinoids, as COX-2 have been shown to utilize endocannabinoids as substrates, and may have a key role in both the therapeutic effects and adverse effects of NSAIDs, as well as in NSAID-induced placebo responses.

Nonsteroidal anti-inflammatory drugs are also used in the acute pain caused by gout because they inhibit urate crystal phagocytosis besides inhibition of prostaglandin synthase.

=== Antipyretic activity ===
Nonsteroidal anti-inflammatory drugs have antipyretic activity and can be used to treat fever. Fever is caused by elevated levels of prostaglandin E_{2} (PGE_{2}), which alters the firing rate of neurons within the hypothalamus that control thermoregulation. Antipyretics work by inhibiting the enzyme COX, which causes the general inhibition of prostanoid biosynthesis (PGE_{2}) within the hypothalamus. PGE_{2} signals to the hypothalamus to increase the body's thermal setpoint. Ibuprofen has been shown more effective as an antipyretic than paracetamol (acetaminophen). Arachidonic acid is the precursor substrate for cyclooxygenase leading to the production of prostaglandins F, D, and E.

== Classification ==
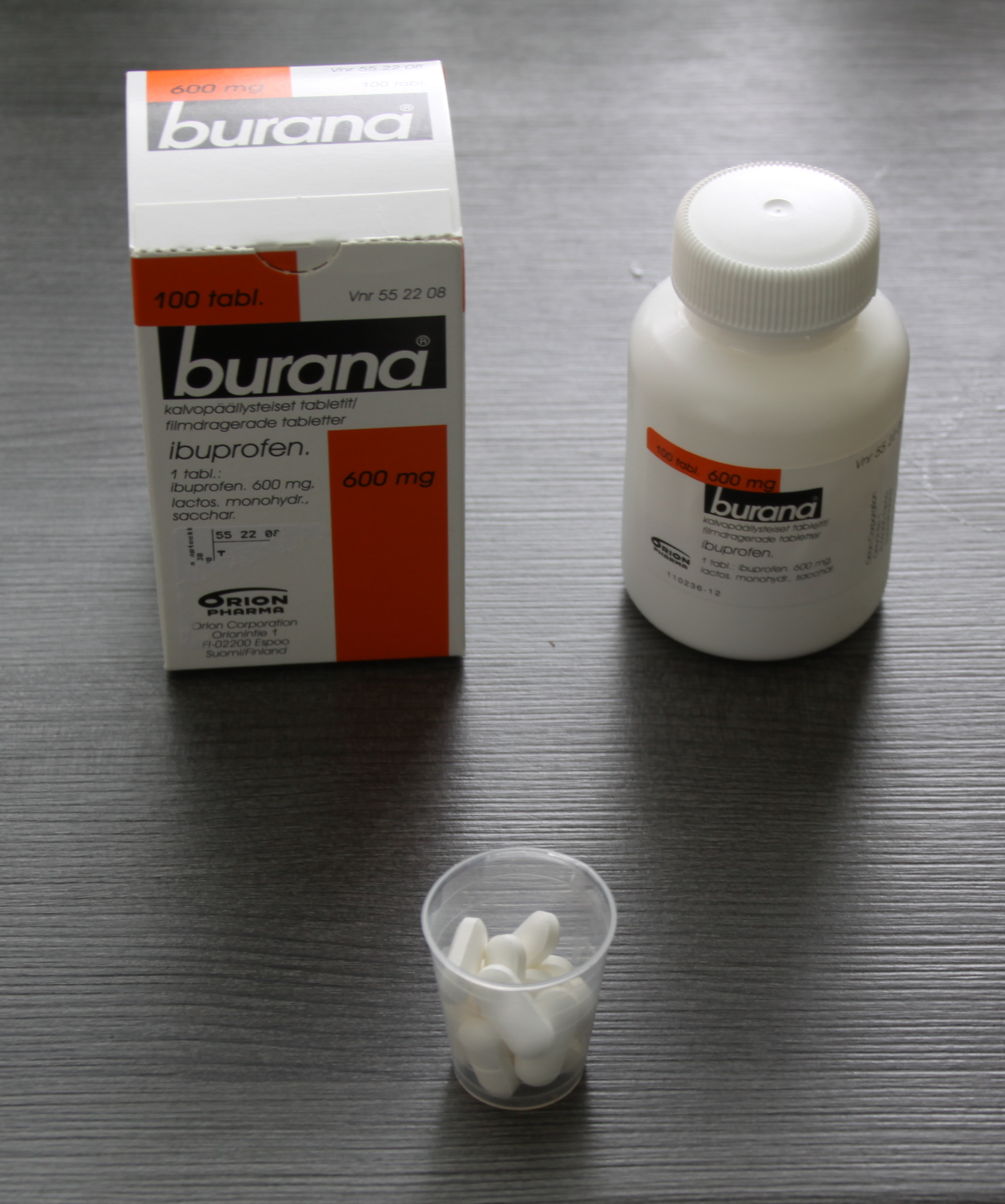
Burana 600 mg – ibuprofen package

Nonsteroidal anti-inflammatory drugs can be classified based on their chemical structure or mechanism of action. Older NSAIDs were known long before their mechanism of action was elucidated and were, for this reason, classified by chemical structure or origin. Newer substances are more often classified by mechanism of action.

=== Salicylates ===
- Aspirin (acetylsalicylic acid)
- Diflunisal (Dolobid)
- Ethenzamide
- Salicylamide
- Salicylic acid and its salts
- Salsalate (Disalcid)
- Choline salicylate
- Methyl salicylate
- Sodium salicylate

=== Propionic acid derivatives ===
- Ibuprofen
- Dexibuprofen
- Naproxen
- Fenoprofen
- Ketoprofen
- Dexketoprofen
- Flurbiprofen
- Oxaprozin
- Loxoprofen
- Pelubiprofen
- Zaltoprofen
- Fenbufen
- Tiaprofenic acid
- Carprofen

=== Acetic acid derivatives ===
- Indomethacin
- Acemetacin
- Tolmetin
- Sulindac
- Etodolac
- Ketorolac
- Diclofenac
- Fenclofenac
- Aceclofenac
- Bromfenac
- Fentiazac
- Nabumetone (drug itself is non-acidic, but the active, principal metabolite has a carboxylic acid group)

=== Enolic acid (oxicam) derivatives ===
- Piroxicam
- Ampiroxicam
- Meloxicam
- Tenoxicam
- Droxicam
- Lornoxicam
- Isoxicam (withdrawn from market 1985)
- Phenylbutazone (Bute)

=== Anthranilic acid derivatives (Fenamates) ===
The following NSAIDs are derived from fenamic acid, which is a derivative of anthranilic acid, which in turn is a nitrogen isostere of salicylic acid, which is the active metabolite of aspirin.

- Mefenamic acid
- Meclofenamic acid
- Flufenamic acid
- Tolfenamic acid
- Etofenamate

=== Selective COX-2 inhibitors (Coxibs) ===
- Celecoxib (FDA alert)
- Rofecoxib (withdrawn from market)
- Valdecoxib (withdrawn from market)
- Parecoxib FDA withdrawn, licensed in the EU
- Lumiracoxib TGA cancelled registration
- Etoricoxib not FDA approved, licensed in the EU
- Firocoxib used in dogs and horses
- Deracoxib labeled for use in dogs
- Robenacoxib labeled for use in dogs and cats

=== Sulfonanilides ===
- Nimesulide (systemic preparations are banned by several countries for the potential risk of hepatotoxicity)

=== Others ===
- Benzydamine (commonly branded as Tantum Verde or Difflam) is an indazole derivative with local anaesthetic and analgesic properties
- Clonixin
- Licofelone acts by inhibiting LOX (lipooxygenase) and COX and hence is known as a 5-LOX/COX inhibitor
- H-harpagide in figwort or devil's claw
- Some NSAIDs are also given intravenously, such as Ketorolac and Diclofenac sodium.

=== Chirality ===
Nonsteroidal anti-inflammatory drugs are chiral molecules; diclofenac and the oxicams are exceptions. However, the majority are prepared as racemic mixtures. Typically, only a single enantiomer is pharmacologically active. For some drugs (typically profens), an isomerase enzyme in vivo converts the inactive enantiomer into the active form, although its activity varies widely in individuals. This phenomenon is likely responsible for the poor correlation between NSAID efficacy and plasma concentration observed in older studies when specific analysis of the active enantiomer was not performed.

Ibuprofen and ketoprofen are available in single-enantiomer preparations (dexibuprofen and dexketoprofen), which purport to offer quicker onset and an improved side-effect profile. Naproxen has been sold as the single active enantiomer.

=== Main practical differences ===
Nonsteroidal anti-inflammatory drugs within a group tend to have similar characteristics and tolerability. There is little difference in clinical efficacy among the NSAIDs when used at equivalent doses. Rather, differences among compounds usually relate to dosing regimens (related to the compound's elimination half-life), route of administration, and tolerability profile.

Regarding adverse effects, selective COX-2 inhibitors have a lower risk of gastrointestinal bleeding. Except for naproxen, nonselective NSAIDs increase the risk of having a heart attack. Some data also supports that the partially selective nabumetone is less likely to cause gastrointestinal events.

Consumers Union found that ibuprofen, naproxen, and salsalate are less expensive than other NSAIDs, and essentially as effective and safe when used appropriately to treat osteoarthritis and pain.

== Pharmacokinetics ==
Nonsteroidal anti-inflammatory drugs are weak acids, with a pKa of 3–5. Except for aspirin, they are generally absorbed well in the digestive system. Since they are highly protein-bound in plasma (typically >95%), usually to albumin, their volume of distribution is typically low and restricted to the space outside of cells. NSAIDs are metabolized in the liver by oxidation enzymes and then conjugated into inactive metabolites that are typically excreted in the urine, though some drugs are partially excreted in bile. Therefore, problems with liver function can lead to the abnormal processing of NSAIDs, which may increase the risk of digestive system or kidney related side effects.

Nonsteroidal anti-inflammatory drugs can also be divided into short-acting (plasma half-life less than 6 h) such as aspirin, diclofenac, and ibuprofen; and long-acting (half-life approximately greater than 10 h) such as naproxen and celecoxib.

== History ==
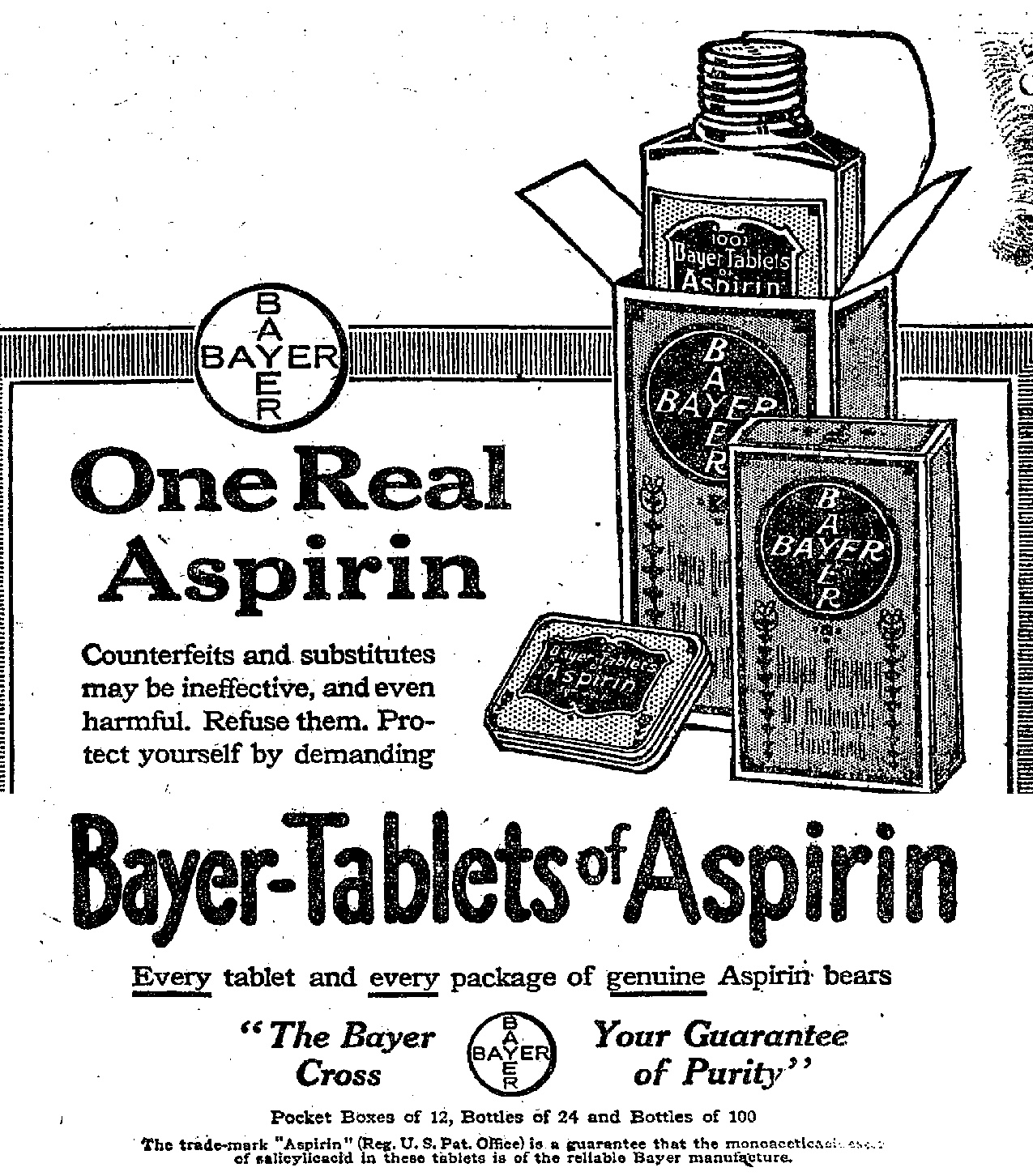
One of the first advertisements for Bayer Aspirin, published in The New York Times in 1917

It is widely believed that naturally occurring salicin in willow trees and other plants was used by the ancients as a form of analgesic or anti-inflammatory drug, but this story, although compelling, is not entirely true. Hippocrates does not mention willow at all. Dioscorides's De materia medica was arguably the most influential herbal from Roman to Medieval times but, if he mentions willow at all (there is doubt about the identity of 'Itea'), then he used the ashes, steeped in vinegar, as a treatment for corns, which corresponds well with modern uses of salicylic acid.

Willow bark (from trees of the Salix genus) was widely known to be used as a medicine by multiple First Nations communities. The bark would be chewed or steeped in water for its pain relieving and antipyretic effects. The effects are a result of the bark's salicin content. Meadowsweet, another plant to contain salicin, has strong roots in British folk medicine for the same maladies. Willow bark was first reported in Western science by Edward Stone in 1763 as a treatment for ague (fever) according to the pseudoscientific doctrine of signatures.

In the body, salicin is turned into salicylic acid, which produces the antipyretic and analgesic effects that the plants are known for.

Salicin was first isolated by Johann Andreas Buchner in 1827. By 1829, French chemist Henri Leroux had improved the extraction process to obtain about 30g of purified salicin from 1.5 kg of willow bark. By hydrolysis, salicin releases glucose and salicyl alcohol which can be converted into salicylic acid, both in vivo and through chemical methods. In 1869, Hermann Kolbe synthesised salicylic acid, although it was too acidic for the gastric mucosa. The reaction used to synthesise aromatic acid from a phenol in the presence of CO_{2} is known as the Kolbe-Schmitt reaction.

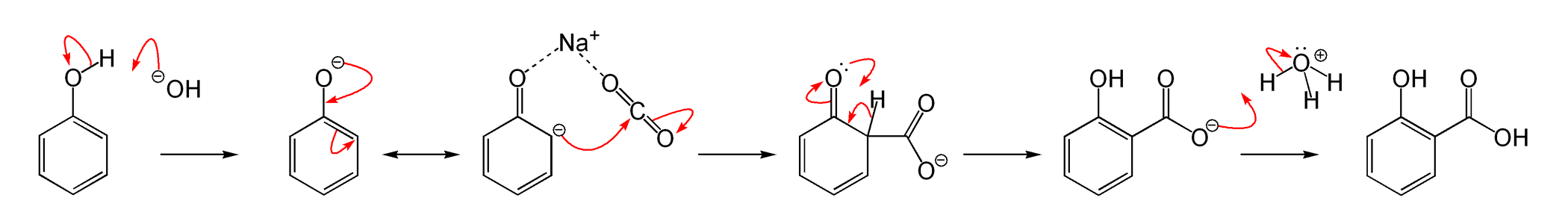
Kolbe–Schmitt reaction mechanism

By 1897, the German chemist Felix Hoffmann and the Bayer company prompted a new age of pharmacology by converting salicylic acid into acetylsalicylic acid—named aspirin by Heinrich Dreser. Other NSAIDs like ibuprofen were developed from the 1950s forward. In 2001, NSAIDs accounted for 70,000,000 prescriptions and 30 billion over-the-counter doses sold annually in the United States.

== Veterinary use ==
Research supports the use of NSAIDs for the control of pain associated with veterinary procedures such as dehorning and castration of calves. The best effect is obtained by combining a short-term local anesthetic such as lidocaine with an NSAID acting as a longer term analgesic. However, as different species have varying reactions to different medications in the NSAID family, little of the existing research data can be extrapolated to animal species other than those specifically studied, and the relevant government agency in one area sometimes prohibits uses approved in other jurisdictions.

In the United States, meloxicam is approved for use only in canines, whereas (due to concerns about kidney damage) it carries warnings against its use in cats except for one-time use during surgery. In spite of these warnings, meloxicam is frequently prescribed "off-label" for non-canine animals including cats and livestock species. In other countries, for example the European Union (EU), there is a label claim for use in cats.

== See also ==
- Discovery and development of cyclooxygenase 2 inhibitors
