= Sulfanitran =

Chemical compound

Clinical data
- Other names: N^{4}-Acetyl-N^{1}-(para-nitrophenyl)sulfanilamide; APNPS; NSC-77120
- Drug class: Antibiotics; Sulfonamides

Identifiers
- IUPAC name: N-[4-[(4-Nitrophenyl)sulfamoyl]phenyl]acetamide
- CAS Number: 122-16-7
- PubChem CID: 5334
- ChemSpider: 5143
- UNII: QT35T5T35Q
- KEGG: D05951
- CompTox Dashboard (EPA): DTXSID4045898

Chemical and physical data
- Formula: C_{14}H_{13}N_{3}O_{5}S
- Molar mass: 335.33 g·mol^{−1}
- 3D model (JSmol): Interactive image
- SMILES: CC(=O)NC1=CC=C(C=C1)S(=O)(=O)NC2=CC=C(C=C2)[N+](=O)[O-]
- InChI: InChI=1S/C14H13N3O5S/c1-10(18)15-11-4-8-14(9-5-11)23(21,22)16-12-2-6-13(7-3-12)17(19)20/h2-9,16H,1H3,(H,15,18); Key:GWBPFRGXNGPPMF-UHFFFAOYSA-N

Sulfanitran is a sulfonamide antibiotic which is used in the poultry industry. It is a component of Novastat, Polystat, and Unistat, brand names of feed additives for chickens used to control Coccidioides spp.
