= Mechanism of action of aspirin =

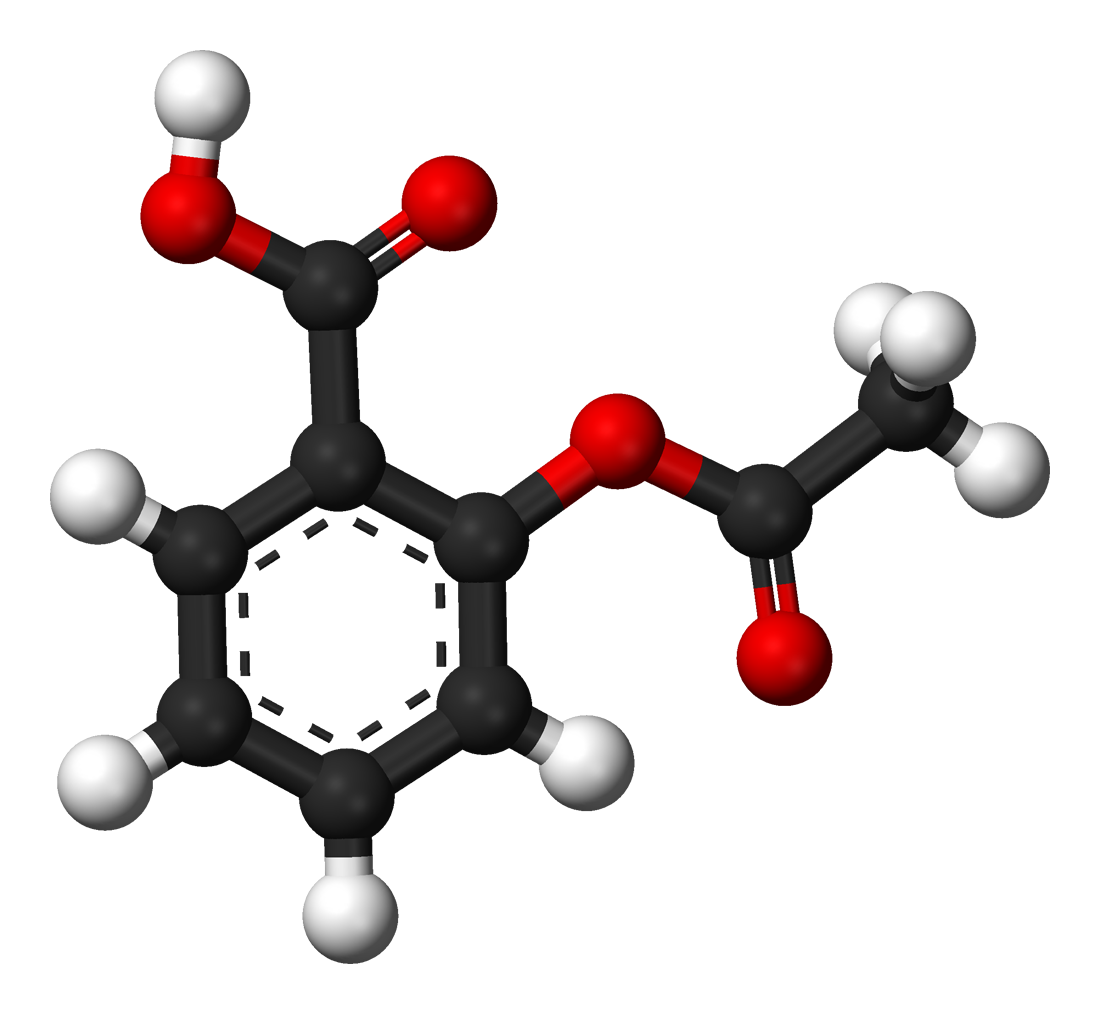
Tridimensional model of the chemical structure of aspirin.

Aspirin causes several different effects in the body, mainly the reduction of inflammation, analgesia (relief of pain), prevention of clotting, and reduction of fever. Much of this is believed to be due to decreased production of prostaglandins and TXA2. Aspirin's ability to suppress the production of prostaglandins and thromboxanes is due to its irreversible inactivation of the cyclooxygenase (COX) enzyme. Cyclooxygenase is required for prostaglandin and thromboxane synthesis. Aspirin acts as an acetylating agent where an acetyl group is covalently attached to a serine residue in the active site of the COX enzyme. This makes aspirin different from other Nonsteroidal Anti-Inflammatory Drugs (NSAIDs) (such as diclofenac and ibuprofen), which are reversible inhibitors; aspirin creates an allosteric change in the structure of the COX enzyme. However, other effects of aspirin, such as uncoupling oxidative phosphorylation in mitochondria, and the modulation of signaling through NF-κB, are also being investigated. Some of its effects are like those of salicylic acid, which is not an acetylating agent.

== Effects on cyclooxygenase ==
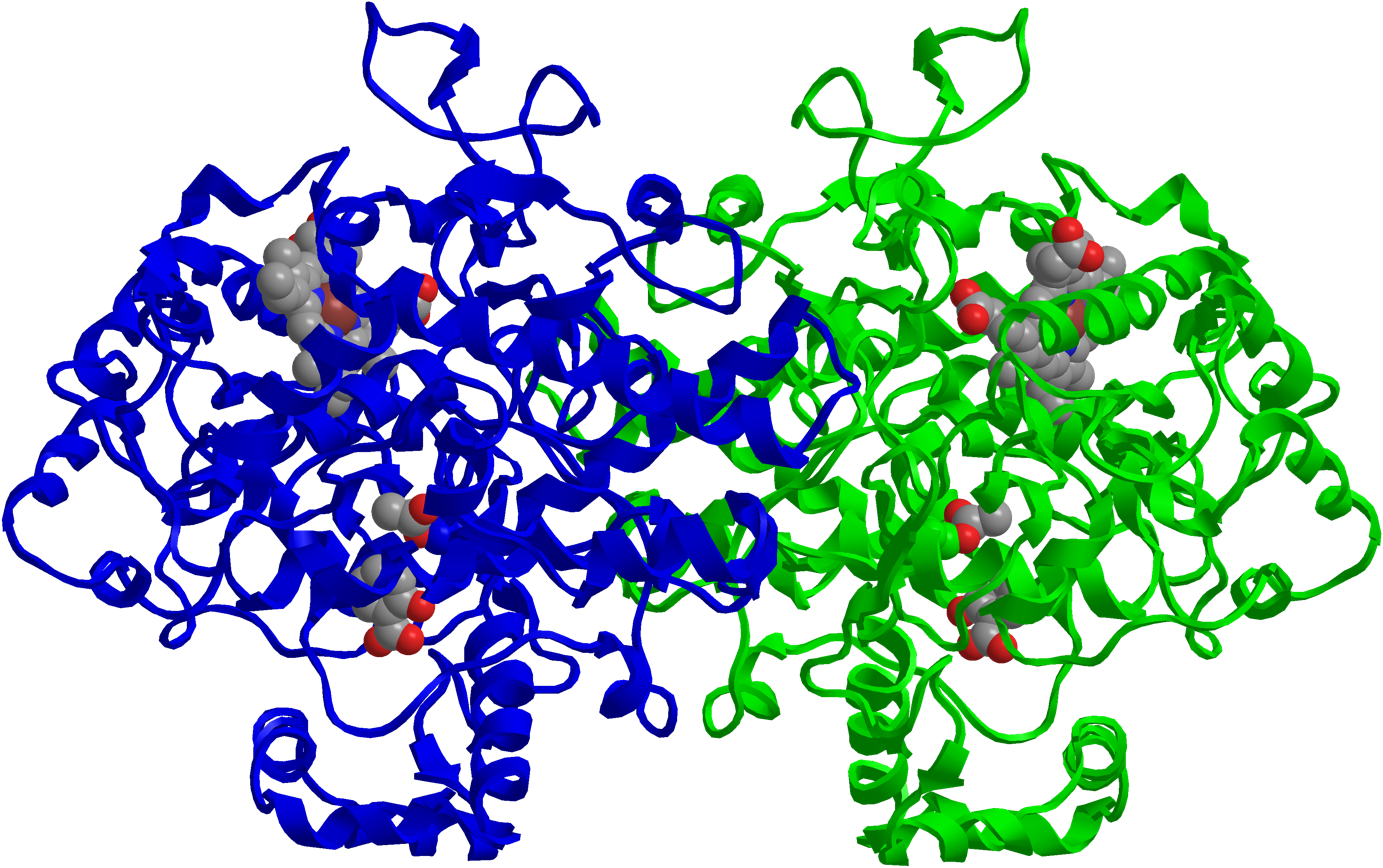
Structure of COX-2 inactivated by Aspirin. In the active site of each of the two enzymes, Serine 516 has been acetylated. Also visible is the salicylic acid which has transferred the acetyl group, and the heme cofactor.

There are at least two different cyclooxygenase isozymes: COX-1 (PTGS1) and COX-2 (PTGS2). Aspirin is non-selective and irreversibly inhibits both forms (but is weakly more selective for COX-1). It does so by acetylating the hydroxyl of a serine residue at the 530 amino acid position. Normally COX produces prostaglandins, most of which are pro-inflammatory, and thromboxanes, which promote clotting. Aspirin-modified COX-2 produces 15-epi-lipoxins, which act to resolve inflammatory responses similar to other lipoxins.

Newer NSAID drugs called COX-2 selective inhibitors have been developed and inhibit only COX-2, with the hope for reducing gastrointestinal side-effects. However, several COX-2 selective inhibitors have subsequently been withdrawn after evidence emerged that COX-2 inhibitors increase the risk of heart attack. The underlying mechanism for the deleterious effect proposes that endothelial cells lining the microvasculature in the body express COX-2, whose selective inhibition results in the down-regulation of prostaglandin I2 (PGI2, prostacyclin) levels relative to thromboxane (since COX-1 in platelets is unaffected). Thus, the protective anti-coagulative effect of PGI2 is decreased, increasing the risk of thrombus and associated heart attacks and other circulatory problems. As platelets have only mitochondria DNA (mtDNA), they are unable to synthesize new COX once aspirin has irreversibly inhibited the enzyme, which is an important difference between aspirin and the reversible inhibitors.

== Effects on prostaglandins and thromboxanes ==
Prostaglandins are local chemical messengers that exert multiple effects, including but not limited to, the transmission of pain information to the brain, modulation of the hypothalamic thermostat, and inflammation. They are produced in response to the stimulation of phospholipids within the plasma membrane of cells resulting in the release of arachidonic acid (prostaglandin precursor). Thromboxanes are responsible for the aggregation of platelets that form blood clots.

Low-dose, long-term aspirin use irreversibly blocks the formation of thromboxane A_{2} in platelets, producing an inhibitory effect on platelet aggregation. This effect is mediated by the irreversible blockage of COX-1 in platelets, since mature platelets do not express COX-2.

This anti-platelet property makes aspirin useful for reducing the incidence of heart attacks which are primarily caused by blood clots. The introduction of small amounts of aspirin has been seen to be an effective medical intervention. A dose of 40 mg of aspirin a day is able to inhibit a large proportion of maximum thromboxane A_{2} release which is provoked acutely, while prostaglandin I2 synthesis being little affected; however, higher doses of aspirin are required to attain further inhibition.

A side-effect of this aspirin mechanism is that the ability of the blood to clot is reduced, and excessive bleeding may result from the use of aspirin.

== Other methods of action ==
Aspirin has been shown to have three additional modes of action. It uncouples oxidative phosphorylation in cartilaginous (and hepatic) mitochondria, by diffusing from the intermembrane space as a proton carrier back into the mitochondrial matrix, where it ionizes once again to release protons. In short, aspirin buffers and transports the protons, acting as a competitor to ATP synthase. When high doses of aspirin are given, aspirin may actually cause hyperthermia due to the heat released from the electron transport chain, as opposed to the antipyretic action of aspirin seen with lower doses.

Additionally, aspirin induces the formation of nitric oxide (NO)-radicals in the body, which have been shown in mice to have an independent mechanism of reducing inflammation. This reduces leukocyte adhesion, which is an important step in the immune response to infection. There is currently insufficient evidence to show that aspirin helps to fight infection.

More recent data also suggests that salicylic acid and its derivatives modulate signaling through NF-κB. NF-κB is a transcription factor complex that plays a central role in many biological processes, including inflammation.

== Reye's syndrome ==
Reye's syndrome is a potentially fatal disease that causes numerous detrimental effects in many organs, especially the brain and liver, as well as causing hypoglycemia. The exact cause of this disease is unknown, and while it has been associated with aspirin consumption in children with viral illness, it also occurs in the absence of aspirin use.

The disease causes fatty liver with minimal inflammation and severe encephalopathy (with swelling of the brain). The liver may become slightly enlarged and firm, and there is a change in the appearance of the kidneys. Jaundice is not usually present.

Early diagnosis is vital; while most children recover with supportive therapy, severe brain injury or death are potential complications.

== See also ==
- History of aspirin
