= Ampiroxicam =

Chemical compound

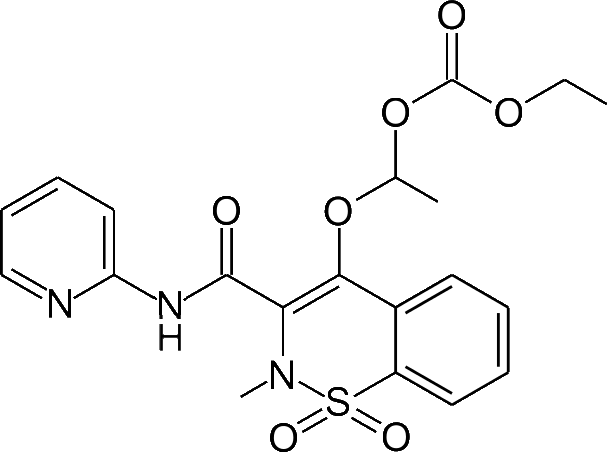

Clinical data
- AHFS/Drugs.com: International Drug Names
- Routes of administration: Oral
- ATC code: none

Legal status
- Legal status: In general: ℞ (Prescription only)

Identifiers
- IUPAC name: (RS)-Ethyl 1-[2-methyl-1,1-dioxo-3-(pyridin-2-ylcarbamoyl)benzo[e]thiazin-4-yl]oxyethyl carbonate
- CAS Number: 99464-64-9
- PubChem CID: 2176
- ChemSpider: 2091
- UNII: 0PV32JZB1J
- KEGG: D01397
- ChEBI: CHEBI:31210
- ChEMBL: ChEMBL1909052
- CompTox Dashboard (EPA): DTXSID6046474
- ECHA InfoCard: 100.235.757

Chemical and physical data
- Formula: C_{20}H_{21}N_{3}O_{7}S
- Molar mass: 447.46 g·mol^{−1}
- 3D model (JSmol): Interactive image
- Chirality: Racemic mixture
- SMILES: CCOC(=O)OC(C)OC1=C(N(S(=O)(=O)C2=CC=CC=C21)C)C(=O)NC3=CC=CC=N3
- InChI: InChI=1S/C20H21N3O7S/c1-4-28-20(25)30-13(2)29-18-14-9-5-6-10-15(14)31(26,27)23(3)17(18)19(24)22-16-11-7-8-12-21-16/h5-13H,4H2,1-3H3,(H,21,22,24); Key:LSNWBKACGXCGAJ-UHFFFAOYSA-N

Ampiroxicam (INN) is a non-steroidal anti-inflammatory drug (NSAID). It is a prodrug of piroxicam. It has been studied for potential anticancer activity, but preliminary results did not show evidence of such activity.
