= Piroxicam =

Chemical compound

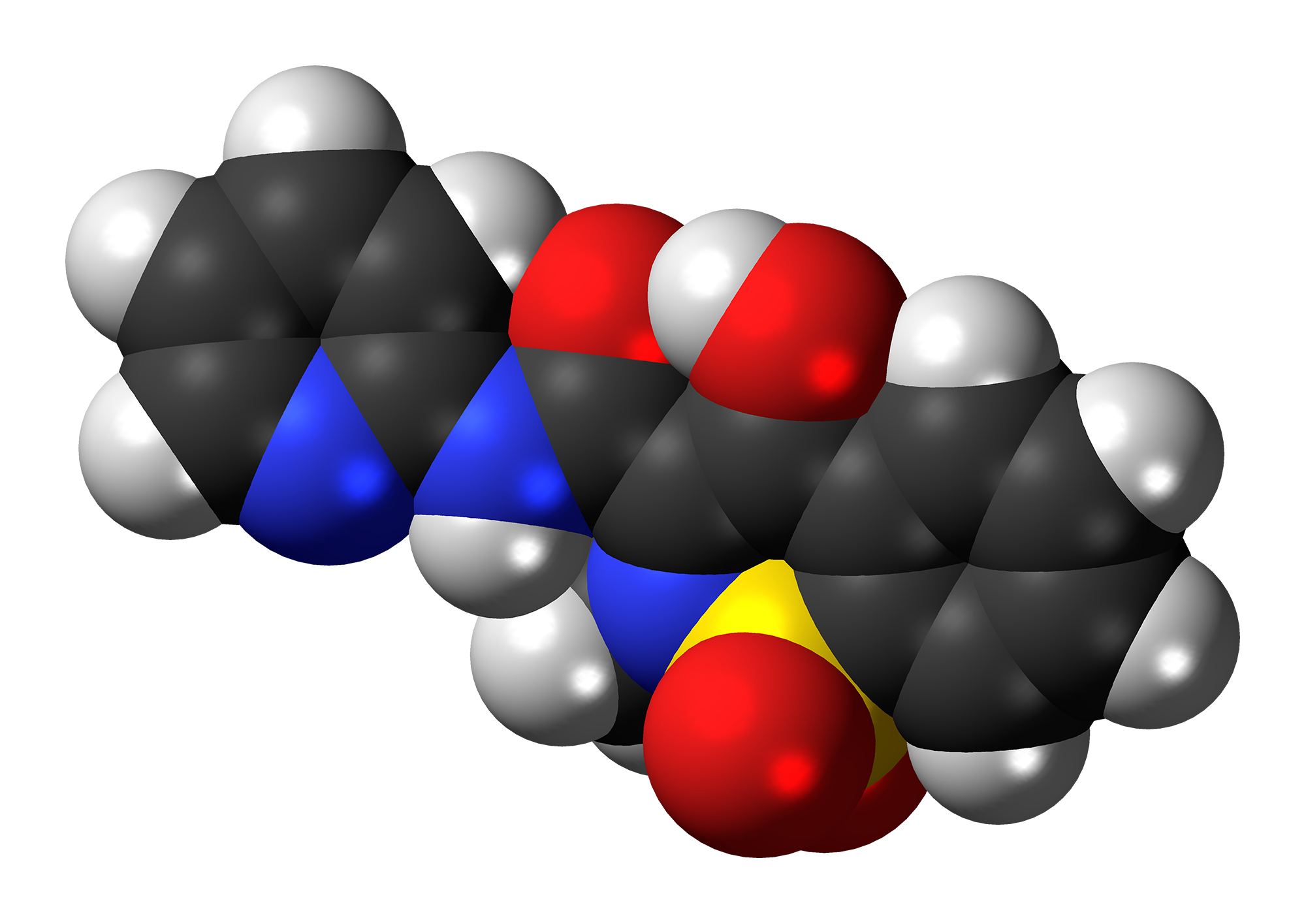

Clinical data
- Pronunciation: /paɪˈrɒksɪˌkæm/
- Trade names: Feldene, others
- Other names: Piroksikam, piroxikam
- AHFS/Drugs.com: Monograph
- MedlinePlus: a684045
- Pregnancy category: AU: C
- Routes of administration: By mouth
- ATC code: M01AC01 (WHO) M02AA07 (WHO), S01BC06 (WHO)

Legal status
- Legal status: AU: S4 (Prescription only); CA: ℞-only; UK: POM (Prescription only); US: ℞-only; EU: Rx-only

Pharmacokinetic data
- Protein binding: 99%
- Metabolism: Liver-mediated hydroxylation and glucuronidation
- Elimination half-life: 50 hours
- Excretion: Urine, faeces

Identifiers
- IUPAC name: 4-Hydroxy-2-methyl-N-(2-pyridinyl)-2H-1,2-benzothiazine-3-carboxamide 1,1-dioxide
- CAS Number: 36322-90-4
- PubChem CID: 54676228
- IUPHAR/BPS: 7273
- DrugBank: DB00554
- ChemSpider: 10442653
- UNII: 13T4O6VMAM
- KEGG: D00127
- ChEBI: CHEBI:8249
- ChEMBL: ChEMBL527
- CompTox Dashboard (EPA): DTXSID5021170
- ECHA InfoCard: 100.048.144

Chemical and physical data
- Formula: C_{15}H_{13}N_{3}O_{4}S
- Molar mass: 331.35 g·mol^{−1}
- 3D model (JSmol): Interactive image
- SMILES: OC=2c1ccccc1S(=O)(=O)N(C)C=2C(=O)Nc3ccccn3
- InChI: InChI=1S/C15H13N3O4S/c1-18-13(15(20)17-12-8-4-5-9-16-12)14(19)10-6-2-3-7-11(10)23(18,21)22/h2-9,19H,1H3,(H,16,17,20); Key:QYSPLQLAKJAUJT-UHFFFAOYSA-N

Piroxicam is a nonsteroidal anti-inflammatory drug (NSAID) of the oxicam class used to relieve the symptoms of painful inflammatory conditions like arthritis. Piroxicam works by preventing the production of endogenous prostaglandins which are involved in the mediation of pain, stiffness, tenderness and swelling. The medicine is available as capsules, tablets and, in some countries, as a prescription-free gel 0.5%. It is also available in a betadex formulation, which allows a more rapid absorption of piroxicam from the digestive tract. Piroxicam is one of the few NSAIDs that can be given parenteral routes.

It was patented in 1968 by Pfizer and approved for medical use in 1979. It became generic in 1992, and is marketed worldwide under many brand names.

== Medical uses ==
It is used in the treatment of certain inflammatory conditions like rheumatoid and osteoarthritis, primary dysmenorrhoea, and postoperative pain; it acts as an analgesic, especially where there is an inflammatory component. The European Medicines Agency issued a review of its use in 2007 and recommended that its use be limited to the treatment of chronic inflammatory conditions, as it is only in these circumstances that its risk-benefit ratio proves to be favourable.

== Adverse effects ==
As with other NSAIDs the principal side effects include: digestive complaints like nausea, discomfort, diarrhoea and bleeds or ulceration of the stomach, as well as headache, dizziness, nervousness, depression, drowsiness, insomnia, vertigo, hearing disturbances (such as tinnitus), high blood pressure, oedema, light sensitivity, skin reactions (including, albeit rarely, Stevens–Johnson syndrome and toxic epidermal necrolysis) and rarely, kidney failure, pancreatitis, liver damage, visual disturbances, pulmonary eosinophilia and fibrosing alveolitis. Compared to other NSAIDs it is more prone to causing gastrointestinal disturbances and serious skin reactions.

In October 2020, the U.S. Food and Drug Administration (FDA) required the prescribing information to be updated for all nonsteroidal anti-inflammatory medications to describe the risk of kidney problems in unborn babies that result in low amniotic fluid. They recommend avoiding NSAIDs in pregnant women at 20 weeks or later in pregnancy.

== Mechanism of action ==
Piroxicam is an NSAID and, as such, is a non-selective COX inhibitor possessing both analgesic and antipyretic properties.

== Chemical properties ==
Piroxicam exists as alkenol tautomer in organic solvents and as zwitterionic form in water. Piroxicam features a sultam, a cyclic sulfonamide.

== History ==
The project that produced piroxicam began in 1962 at Pfizer; the first clinical trial results were reported in 1977, and the product launched in 1980 under the brand name "Feldene". Major patents expired in 1992 and the drug is marketed worldwide under many brandnames.

== See also ==
- Meloxicam
- Isoxicam
- Lornoxicam
- Ampiroxicam
