= Medication package insert =

Document included in a package of medicine

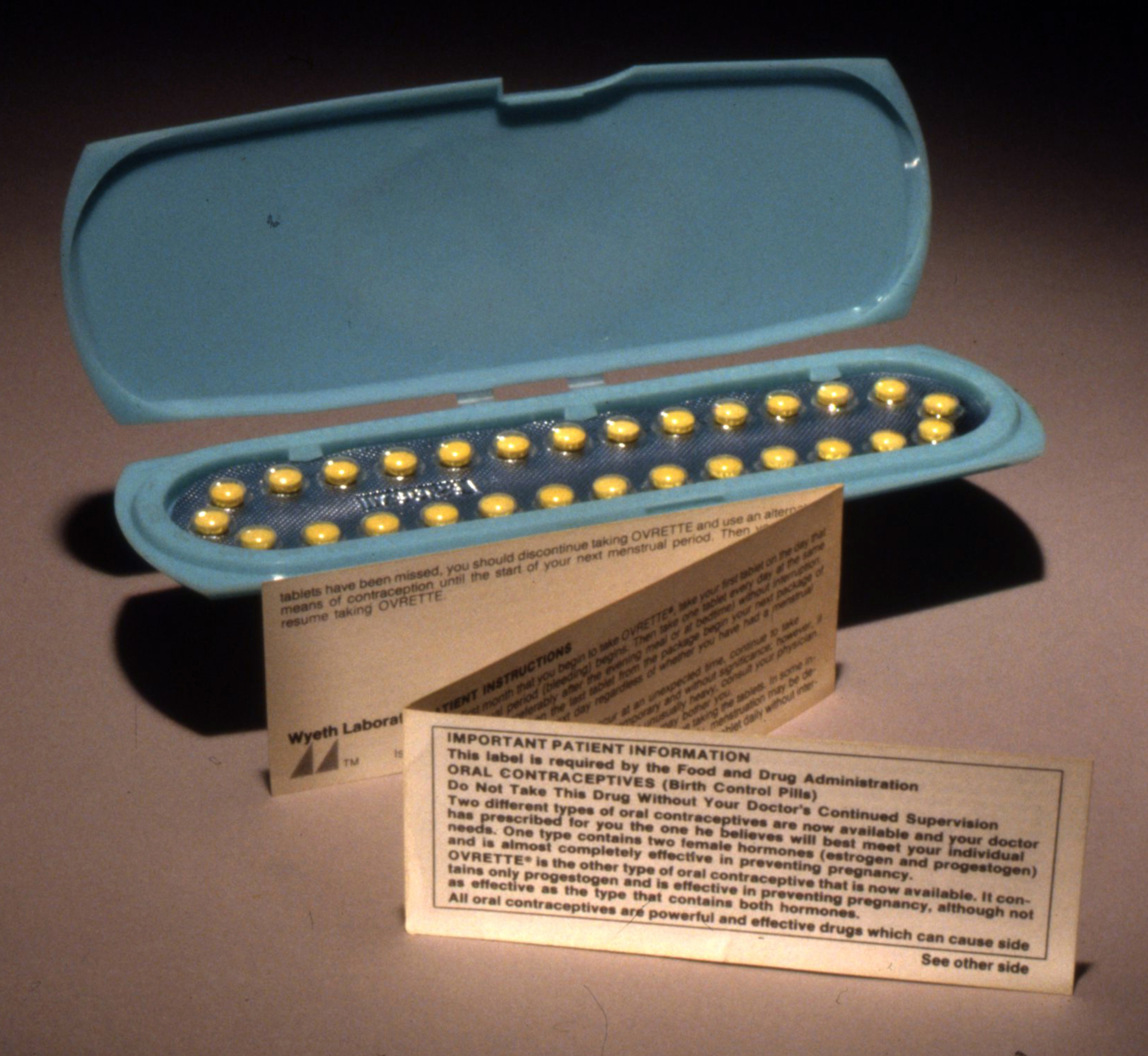
A package insert from 1970, with Ovrette brand contraception pills

A package insert is a document included in the package of a medication that provides information about that drug and its use. For prescription medications, the insert is technical, providing information for medical professionals about how to prescribe the drug. Package inserts for prescription drugs often include a separate document called a "patient package insert" with information written in plain language intended for the end-user—the person who will take the drug or give the drug to another person, such as a minor. Inserts for over-the-counter medications are also written plainly.

In the United States, labelling for the healthcare practitioner is called "Prescribing Information" (PI), and labelling for patients and/or caregivers includes "Medication Guides", "Patient Package Inserts", and "Instructions for Use". In Europe, the technical document is called the "summary of product characteristics" (SmPC), and the document for end-users is called the "patient information leaflet" (PIL) or "package leaflet".

Similar documents attached to the outside of a package are sometimes called outserts.

== Responsible agencies ==
Each country or region has their own regulatory body.

In the European Union, the European Medicines Agency has jurisdiction and the relevant documents are called the "summary of product characteristics" (SPC or SmPC) and the document for end-users is called the "patient information leaflet" or "package leaflet". The SPC is not intended to give general advice about treatment of a condition but does state how the product is to be used for a specific treatment. It forms the basis of information for health professionals to know how to use the specific product safely and effectively. The package leaflet supplied with the product is aimed at end-users.

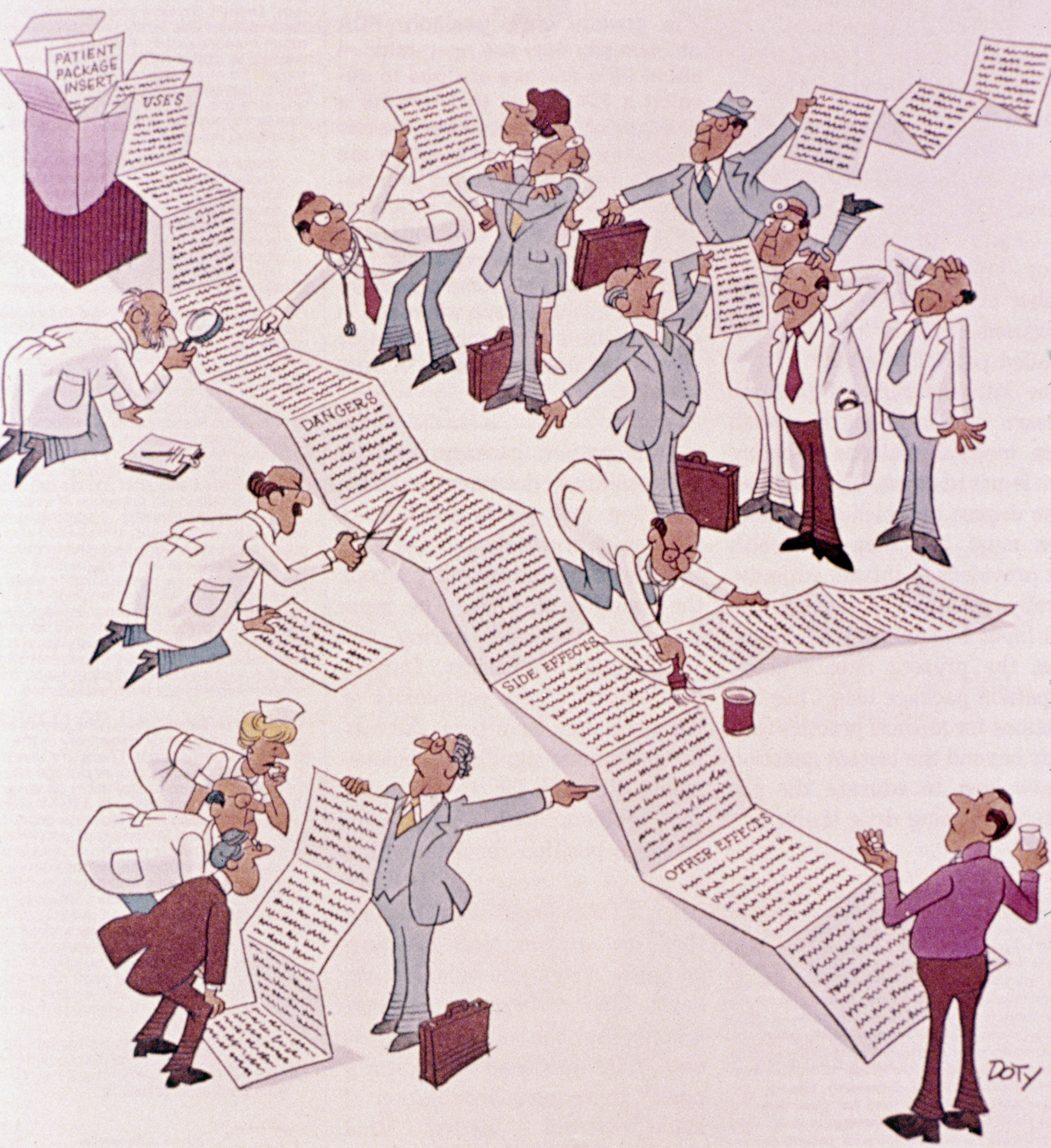
A cartoon by Roy Doty depicting the package insert as overly long and complicated

In the United States, the Food and Drug Administration (FDA) determines the requirements for patient package inserts. In the United States, the FDA will occasionally issue revisions to previously approved package inserts, in much the same way as an auto manufacturer will issue recalls upon discovering a problem with a certain car. The list of 1997 drug labelling changes can be found on the FDA's website, here. The first patient package insert required by the FDA was in 1968, mandating that isoproterenol inhalation medication must contain a short warning that excessive use could cause breathing difficulties. The second patient package insert required by the FDA was in 1970, mandating that combined oral contraceptive pills must contain information for the patient about specific risks and benefits. The patient package insert issue was revisited in 1980 and in 1995 without conclusive action being taken. Finally, in January 2006, the FDA released a major revision to the patient package insert guidelines, the first in 25 years. The new requirements include a section called Highlights which summarizes the most important information about benefits and risks; a Table of Contents for easy reference; the date of initial product approval; and a toll-free number and Internet address to encourage more widespread reporting of information regarding suspected adverse events.

Other national or international organizations that regulate medical information include the Japanese Ministry of Health, Labour, and Welfare (MHLW). Other country-specific agencies, especially in the case of EU (European Union) countries and candidates, plus countries of South America and many in Asia and the Far East, rely heavily on the work of these three primary regulators.

== Sections of the Prescribing Information ==
The Prescribing Information follows one of two formats: "physician labeling rule" format or "old" (non-PLR) format. For "old" format labeling a "product title" may be listed first and may include the proprietary name (if any), the nonproprietary name, dosage form(s), and other information about the product. The other sections are as follows:

- Description - includes the proprietary name (if any), nonproprietary name, dosage form(s), qualitative and/or quantitative ingredient information, the pharmacologic or therapeutic class of the drug, chemical name and structural formula of the drug, and if appropriate, other important chemical or physical information, such as physical constants, or pH.
- Clinical Pharmacology - tells how the medicine works in the body, how it is absorbed and eliminated, and what its effects are likely to be at various concentrations. May also contain results of various clinical trials (studies) and/or explanations of the medication's effect on various populations (e.g. children, women, etc.).
- Indications and Usage - uses (indications) for which the drug has been FDA-approved (e.g. migraines, seizures, high blood pressure). Physicians legally can and often do prescribe medicines for purposes not listed in this section (so-called "off-label uses").
- Contraindications - lists situations in which the medication should not be used, for example in patients with other medical conditions such as kidney problems or allergies
- Warnings - covers possible serious side effects that may occur (e.g., boxed warning)
- Precautions - explains how to use the medication safely including physical impairments, food (grapefruits) and drug interactions; for example "Do not drink alcohol while taking this medication" or "Do not take this medication if you are currently taking MAOI inhibitors"
- Adverse Reactions - lists all side effects observed in all studies of the drug (as opposed to just the dangerous side effects which are separately listed in "Warnings" section)
- Use in specific populations (pregnancy, lactation (breast-feeding), females and males of reproductive potential, pediatric, geriatric)
- Drug Abuse and Dependence - provides information regarding whether prolonged use of the medication can cause physical dependence (only included if applicable)
- Overdosage - gives the results of an overdose and provides recommended action in such cases
- Dosage and Administration - gives recommended dosage(s); may list more than one for different conditions or different patients (e.g., lower dosages for children)
- How Supplied - includes the dosage form(s), strength(s), units in which the dosage form(s) are ordinarily available, identifying features of the dosage form(s) such as the National Drug Code (NDC), and special handling and storage conditions (e.g., "Store between 68 and 78°F ")

== Other uses and initiatives ==
In addition to the obvious use of inclusion with medications, Prescribing Information have been used or provided in other forms. In the United States, the Prescribing Information for thousands of prescription drugs are available at the DailyMed website, provided by the National Library of Medicine.

South Africa has taken the initiative of making all package inserts available electronically via the internet, listed by trade name, generic name, and classification, and Canada is working on a similar capability. The UK-based electronic medicines compendium provides freely available online access to both Patient Information Leaflets (intended for consumers) and Summary of Product Characteristics (aimed at healthcare professionals) for products available in the UK.

Patient information is, understandably, usually generated initially in the native language of the country where the product is being developed. This leads to inconsistency in format, terminology, tone, and content. PILLS (Patient Information Language Localisation System) is a one-year effort by the European Commission to produce a prototype tool which will support the creation of various kinds of medical documentation simultaneously in multiple languages, by storing the information in a database and allowing a variety of forms and languages of output.

== See also ==
- Drug labelling
- Patient education
