= Isoxicam =

Withdrawn NSAID analgesic drug

Clinical data
- Trade names: Maxicam
- ATC code: M01AC03 (WHO) (withdrawn)

Identifiers
- CAS Number: 34552-84-6
- PubChem CID: 54677972
- DrugBank: DB08942
- ChemSpider: 10442695
- UNII: 8XU734C4NG
- KEGG: D04639
- ChEBI: CHEBI:CHEBI:76163
- CompTox Dashboard (EPA): DTXSID0045462
- ECHA InfoCard: 100.047.334

Chemical and physical data
- Formula: C_{14}H_{13}N_{3}O_{5}S
- Molar mass: 335.33 g·mol^{−1}
- 3D model (JSmol): Interactive image
- SMILES: CC1=CC(=NO1)NC(=O)C2=C(C3=CC=CC=C3S(=O)(=O)N2C)O

Isoxicam is a nonsteroidal anti-inflammatory drug (NSAID) that was taken or applied to reduce inflammation and as an analgesic reducing pain in certain conditions. The drug was introduced in 1983 by the Warner-Lambert Company. Isoxicam is a chemical analog of piroxicam (Feldene) which has a pyridine ring in lieu of an isoxazole ring. In 1985 isoxicam was withdrawn from the French market, due to adverse effects, namely toxic epidermal necrolysis resulting in death. Although these serious side effects were observed only in France, the drug was withdrawn worldwide.
