= Hemantane =

Experimental antiparkinsonian agent and adamantane derivative

Clinical data
- Other names: Hymantane; Gimantan; N-Adamant-2-ylhexamethyleneimine; N-(2-Adamantyl)hexamethyleneimine

Identifiers
- IUPAC name: 1-(2-adamantyl)azepane
- CAS Number: 299424-44-5
- PubChem CID: 9838302
- ChemSpider: 8014022

Chemical and physical data
- Formula: C_{16}H_{27}N
- Molar mass: 233.399 g·mol^{−1}
- 3D model (JSmol): Interactive image
- SMILES: C1CCCN(CC1)C2C3CC4CC(C3)CC2C4
- InChI: InChI=1S/C16H27N/c1-2-4-6-17(5-3-1)16-14-8-12-7-13(10-14)11-15(16)9-12/h12-16H,1-11H2; Key:JAROVUWOMYMQCW-UHFFFAOYSA-N

Hemantane, or hymantane, also known as N-(2-adamantyl)hexamethyleneimine, is an experimental antiparkinsonian agent of the adamantane family that was never marketed. It was developed and studied in Russia.

It has been said to act as a low-affinity non-competitive NMDA receptor antagonist, as a selective MAO-B inhibitor, and as showing various other actions and effects such as modulation of the dopaminergic and serotonergic systems in the striatum. The drug has also been theorized to be a sigma receptor agonist. Analogues of hemantane, such as memantine and amantadine, share some of these actions, like NMDA receptor antagonism, sigma receptor agonism, and dopaminergic modulation.

The drug was first described by 2000.

The dosage of gimantan is standardized to 50mg tablet strength.

== Chemistry ==
Gimantan is synthesized via a modified Leuckart reaction, by heating adamantanone and azepane in the presence of formic acid.

== See also ==
- Bromantane
- Gludantan
- List of Russian drugs
