= Somantadine =

1978 experimental antiviral drug

Clinical data
- Other names: PR 741-976; a,a-Dimethyl-1-adamantaneethylamine; [2-(1-Adamantyl)-1,1-dimethylethyl]amine

Identifiers
- IUPAC name: 1-(1-adamantyl)-2-methylpropan-2-amine
- CAS Number: 79594-24-4
- PubChem CID: 50234
- ChemSpider: 45554
- UNII: 02WMX1FS9Y
- ChEMBL: ChEMBL2111145
- CompTox Dashboard (EPA): DTXSID101000612

Chemical and physical data
- Formula: C_{14}H_{25}N
- Molar mass: 207.361 g·mol^{−1}
- 3D model (JSmol): Interactive image
- SMILES: CC(C)(CC12CC3CC(C1)CC(C3)C2)N
- InChI: InChI=1S/C14H25N/c1-13(2,15)9-14-6-10-3-11(7-14)5-12(4-10)8-14/h10-12H,3-9,15H2,1-2H3; Key:OWKXRDQRMTVCEX-UHFFFAOYSA-N

Somantadine (INN; developmental code name PR 741-976), or somantadine hydrochloride (USAN) in the case of the hydrochloride salt, is an experimental antiviral drug of the adamantane family related to amantadine and rimantadine that was never marketed. It was first described by 1978.
