= Kelupu =

- Location within Borneo
- Coordinates: 2.11667°N 111.68333°E
- Country: Malaysia
- State: Sarawak
- Elevation: 3 m (9.8 ft)

Kelupu is a settlement in Sarawak, Malaysia. It lies approximately 161.5 kilometres (100.4 mi) east-north-east of the state capital Kuching. Neighbouring settlements include:

- Genting 1.9 kilometres (1.2 mi) east
- Temadak 3.7 kilometres (2.3 mi) south
- Labas 4.1 kilometres (2.5 mi) southeast
- Kemantan 5.6 kilometres (3.5 mi) south
