= Labas =

- Location within Borneo
- Coordinates: 2.08333°N 111.7°E
- Country: Malaysia
- State: Sarawak
- Elevation: 14 m (46 ft)

Labas is a settlement in Sarawak, Malaysia. It lies approximately 161.9 kilometres (100.6 mi) east-north-east of the state capital Kuching. Neighbouring settlements include:

- Temadak 1.9 kilometres (1.2 mi) west
- Kemantan 2.6 kilometres (1.6 mi) southwest
- Genting 3.7 kilometres (2.3 mi) north
- Kelupu 4.1 kilometres (2.5 mi) northwest
- Maradong 9.3 kilometres (5.8 mi) west
