= Temadak =

- Location within Borneo
- Coordinates: 2.08333°N 111.68333°E
- Country: Malaysia
- State: Sarawak
- Elevation: 8 m (26 ft)

Temadak is a settlement in Sarawak, Malaysia. It lies approximately 160.1 kilometres (99.5 mi) east-north-east of the state capital Kuching, and its elevation is 8 meters. Neighbouring settlements include:

- Labas 1.9 kilometres (1.2 mi) east
- Kemantan 1.9 kilometres (1.2 mi) south
- Kelupu 3.7 kilometres (2.3 mi) north
- Maradong 7.4 kilometres (4.6 mi) west
