= Tromantadine =

Antiviral medicine used to treat herpes simplex virus

Clinical data
- Trade names: Viru-Merz
- AHFS/Drugs.com: International Drug Names
- Routes of administration: Topical (gel)
- ATC code: D06BB02 (WHO) J05AC03 (WHO)

Legal status
- Legal status: US: Not FDA-approved; OTC (RU)

Identifiers
- IUPAC name: N-(1-adamantyl)-2-[2-(dimethylamino)ethoxy]acetamide
- CAS Number: 53783-83-8
- PubChem CID: 64377
- ChemSpider: 57947
- UNII: H191JFG8WA
- KEGG: D07199
- NIAID ChemDB: 007760
- CompTox Dashboard (EPA): DTXSID00202062
- ECHA InfoCard: 100.053.409

Chemical and physical data
- Formula: C_{16}H_{28}N_{2}O_{2}
- Molar mass: 280.412 g·mol^{−1}
- 3D model (JSmol): Interactive image
- SMILES: O=C(NC13CC2CC(CC(C1)C2)C3)COCCN(C)C
- InChI: InChI=1S/C16H28N2O2/c1-18(2)3-4-20-11-15(19)17-16-8-12-5-13(9-16)7-14(6-12)10-16/h12-14H,3-11H2,1-2H3,(H,17,19); Key:UXQDWARBDDDTKG-UHFFFAOYSA-N

Tromantadine is an antiviral medicine used to treat herpes simplex virus. It is available in a topical gel under trade names Viru-Merz and Viru-Merz Serol. Its performance is similar to aciclovir.

Like rimantadine, amantadine, and adapromine, tromantadine is a derivative of adamantane.

== Mechanism ==
Tromantadine inhibits the early and late events in the virus replication cycle. It changes the glycoproteins of the host cells, therefore impeding the absorption of the virus. It inhibits penetration of the virus. It also prevents uncoating of the virions.
