= C12H21N =

The molecular formula C_{12}H_{21}N (molar mass: 179.30 g/mol, exact mass: 179.1674 u) may refer to:

- Memantine, a novel class of Alzheimer's disease medications
- Rimantadine, an antiviral drug
