= Adapromine =

Chemical compound

Clinical data
- Other names: JP-62, MK-3
- Routes of administration: Oral

Legal status
- Legal status: In general: ℞ (Prescription only)

Identifiers
- IUPAC name: 1-(Adamantan-1-yl)propan-1-amine
- CAS Number: 60196-90-9
- PubChem CID: 547499
- ChemSpider: 476539
- CompTox Dashboard (EPA): DTXSID70975615

Chemical and physical data
- Formula: C_{13}H_{23}N
- Molar mass: 193.334 g·mol^{−1}
- 3D model (JSmol): Interactive image
- SMILES: CCC(C12CC3CC(C1)CC(C3)C2)N

Adapromine is an antiviral drug of the adamantane group related to amantadine (1-aminoadamantane), rimantadine (1-(1-aminoethyl)adamantane), and memantine (1-amino-3,5-dimethyladamantane) that is marketed in Russia for the treatment and prevention of influenza. It is an alkyl analogue of rimantadine and is similar to rimantadine in its antiviral activity but possesses a broader spectrum of action, being effective against influenza viruses of both type A and B. Strains of type A influenza virus with resistance to adapromine and rimantadine and the related drug deitiforine were encountered in Mongolia and the Soviet Union in the 1980s.

Electroencephalography (EEG) studies of animals suggest that adapromine and related adamantanes including amantadine, bromantane (1-amino-2-bromophenyladamantane), and memantine have psychostimulant-like and possibly antidepressant-like effects, and that these effects may be mediated via catecholaminergic processes. These psychostimulant effects differ qualitatively from those of conventional psychostimulants like amphetamine however, and the adamantane derivatives have been described contrarily as "adaptogens" and as "actoprotectors".

In 2004, it was discovered that amantadine and memantine bind to and act as agonists of the σ_{1} receptor (K_{i} = 7.44 μM and 2.60 μM, respectively) and that activation of the σ_{1} receptor is involved in the dopaminergic effects of amantadine at therapeutically relevant concentrations. These findings might also extend to the other adamantanes such as adapromine, rimantadine, and bromantane and could explain the psychostimulant-like effects of this family of compounds.

== Synthesis ==
The first synthesis of adapromine was disclosed in patents by DuPont published in 1967.

1-Adamantanecarboxylic acid, as its acid chloride, is treated with a cadmium-modified Grignard reagent, which gives the ketone (6). Oxime formation with hydroxylamine, followed by reduction using lithium aluminium hydride yields adapromine.

== See also ==
- Tromantadine
- List of Russian drugs
