= Adamantanone =

Names
- Preferred IUPAC name Adamantan-2-one
- Other names Tricyclo[3.3.1.1^{3,7}]decanone; 2-Adamantanone

Identifiers
CAS Number	700-58-3
3D model (JSmol)	Interactive image
ChEBI	CHEBI:40611
ChEMBL	ChEMBL2041316
ChemSpider	57725
DrugBank	DB02125
ECHA InfoCard	100.010.772
EC Number	211-847-2
Gmelin Reference	122962
PubChem CID	64151
UNII	UI7W503L08
CompTox Dashboard (EPA)	DTXSID9022108
- InChI: InChI=1S/C10H14O/c11-10-8-2-6-1-7(4-8)5-9(10)3-6/h6-9H,1-5H2 Key: IYKFYARMMIESOX-UHFFFAOYSA-N
- SMILES: C1C2CC3CC1CC(C2)C3=O

Properties
Chemical formula	C_{10}H_{14}O
Molar mass	150.221 g·mol^{−1}
Appearance	white solid
Melting point	270 °C (518 °F; 543 K)

Hazards
- GHS labelling
Pictograms	(GHS05: Corrosive) (GHS07: Exclamation mark) (GHS09: Environmental hazard)
Signal word	Danger
Hazard statements	H301, H315, H318, H410
Precautionary statements	P264, P270, P273, P280, P301+P310, P302+P352, P305+P351+P338, P310, P321, P330, P332+P313, P362, P391, P405, P501
- Except where otherwise noted, data are given for materials in their standard state (at 25 °C [77 °F], 100 kPa). Infobox references

Adamantanone is the ketone of adamantane. A white solid, it is prepared by oxidation of adamantane. It is a precursor to several adamantane derivatives.

Adamantanone and some related polycyclic ketones, are reluctant to form enolates. This barrier arises because the resulting carbanion cannot exist in conjugation with the carbonyl pi-bond.

== Applications ==
Adamantanone is used as a precursor in the synthesis of bromantane and idramantone.
