= Bromantane =

Stimulant drug

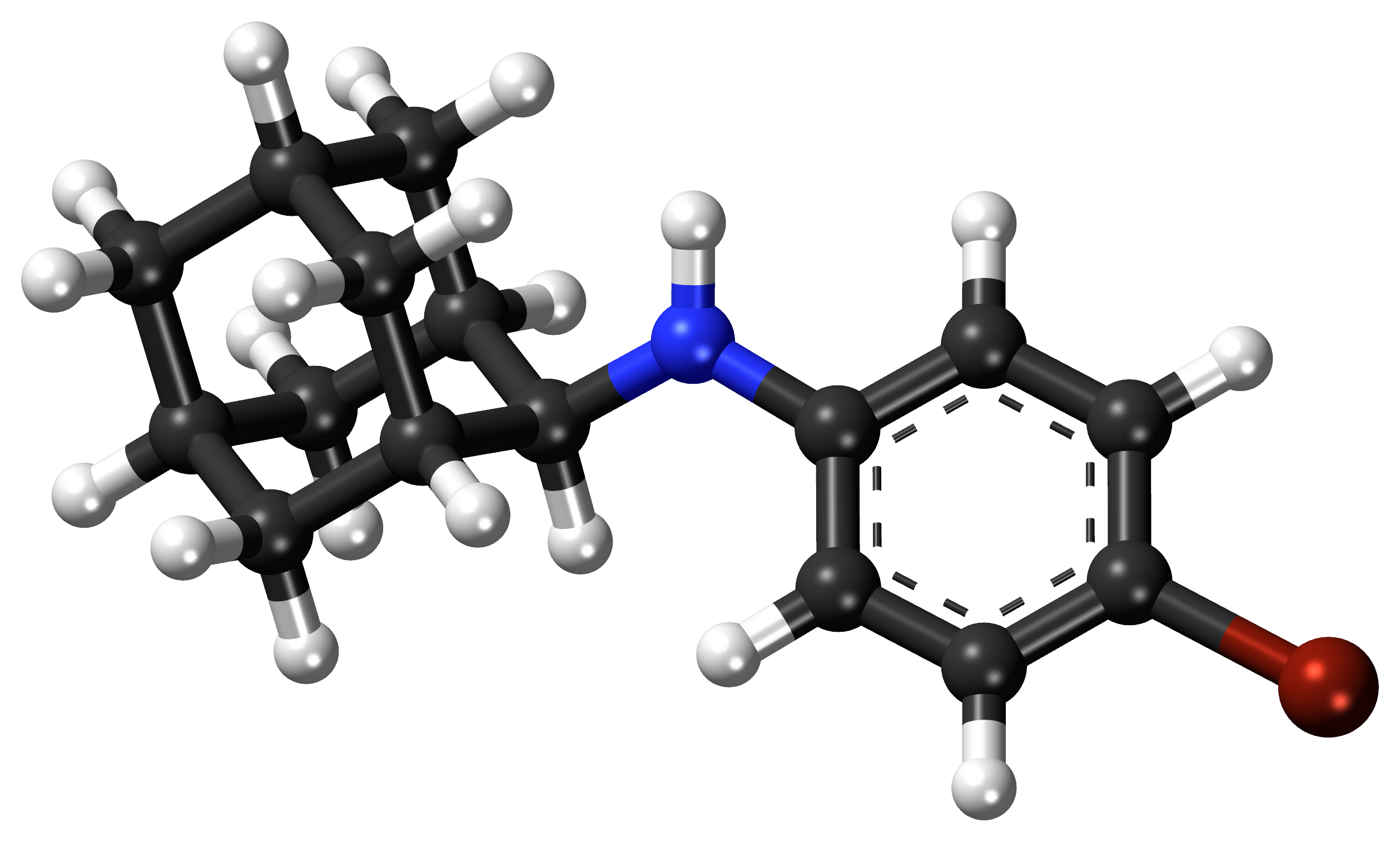

Clinical data
- Trade names: Ladasten
- Other names: Bromantan; Bromontan; ADK-709; N-(2-Adamantyl)-4-bromoaniline; N-(2-Adamantyl)-N-(4-Bromophenyl)amine; N-(4-Bromophenyl)-2-adamantanamine
- Routes of administration: By mouth
- ATC code: None

Legal status
- Legal status: US: Unscheduled, not FDA approved; Rx-only (RU)

Pharmacokinetic data
- Bioavailability: 42%
- Onset of action: 1.5–2 hours (PO)
- Elimination half-life: 11.21 hours (in humans), 7 hours (in rats)
- Duration of action: 8–12 hours (PO)

Identifiers
- IUPAC name: N-(4-Bromophenyl)adamantan-2-amine
- CAS Number: 87913-26-6
- PubChem CID: 4660557
- ChemSpider: 3849628
- UNII: N1ILS53XWK
- CompTox Dashboard (EPA): DTXSID40405333
- ECHA InfoCard: 100.213.907

Chemical and physical data
- Formula: C_{16}H_{20}BrN
- Molar mass: 306.247 g·mol^{−1}
- 3D model (JSmol): Interactive image
- SMILES: Brc1ccc(NC2C3CC4CC(C3)CC2C4)cc1
- InChI: InChI=1S/C16H20BrN/c17-14-1-3-15(4-2-14)18-16-12-6-10-5-11(8-12)9-13(16)7-10/h1-4,10-13,16,18H,5-9H2; Key:LWJALJDRFBXHKX-UHFFFAOYSA-N

Bromantane, sold under the brand name Ladasten, is an atypical central nervous system (CNS) stimulant and anxiolytic drug of the adamantane family that is related to amantadine and memantine. Medically, it is approved in Russia for the treatment of neurasthenia. Although the effects of bromantane have been determined to be dependent on the dopaminergic and possibly serotonergic neurotransmitter systems, its exact mechanism of action is unknown, and is distinct in its properties relative to typical stimulants such as amphetamine. Bromantane has sometimes been described as an actoprotector (synthetic adaptogen).

== Effects ==
=== Clinical research ===
The therapeutic effects of bromantane in asthenia are said to onset within 1–3 days. It has been proposed that the combination of stimulant and anxiolytic activity may give bromantane special efficacy in the treatment of asthenia.

In a large-scale, multi-center clinical trial of 728 patients diagnosed with asthenia in Russia, bromantane was given for 28 days at a daily dose of 50 mg or 100 mg. The study concluded with an impression score of 76.0% on the CGI-S and 90.8% on the CGI-I for bromantane, indicating that it is broadly applicable and highly effective. The therapeutic benefit against asthenia was observed to still be present one month after discontinuation of the drug. 3% of patients experienced side effects; though none were considered serious; and 0.8% of patients discontinued treatment due to side effects. Bromantane was also noted to normalize the sleep-wake cycle.

=== Psychotropic effects ===
Bromantane is described primarily as a mild stimulant and anxiolytic. It is also said to possess anti-asthenic properties. Bromantane is reported to improve physical and mental performance, hence it could be considered a performance-enhancing drug.

Bromantane has been found to lower the levels of pro-inflammatory cytokines IL-6, IL-17 and IL-4 and to normalize behavior in animal models of depression, and may possess clinical efficacy as an antidepressant. It has also been found to increase sexual receptivity and proceptivity in rats of both sexes, which was attributed to its dopaminergic actions. It has been proposed that bromantane may suppress prolactin levels by virtue of its dopaminergic properties as well. Bromantane has been found to "agonize" amphetamine-induced stereotypies in vivo, suggesting that it might potentiate certain effects of other stimulants.

The stimulant effects of bromantane onset gradually within 1.5–2 hours and last for 8–12 hours when taken orally.

== Pharmacology ==
=== Pharmacodynamics ===
==== Dopamine synthesis enhancement ====
Although it is frequently labeled as a stimulant, bromantane is distinct in its pharmacology and effects relative to typical stimulants, such as the phenethylamines (e.g., amphetamine and its derivatives) and their structural analogues (e.g., methylphenidate, cocaine, mesocarb, etc.). Whereas the latter directly act on the dopamine transporter (DAT) to inhibit the reuptake and/or induce the release of dopamine, bromantane instead acts via indirect genomic mechanisms to produce a rapid, pronounced, and long-lasting upregulation in a variety of brain regions of the expression of tyrosine hydroxylase (TH) and aromatic L-amino acid decarboxylase (AAAD) (also known as DOPA decarboxylase), key enzymes in the dopamine biosynthesis pathway. For instance, a single dose of bromantane produces a 2–2.5 fold increase in TH expression in the rat hypothalamus 1.5–2 hours post-administration. The biosynthesis and release of dopamine subsequently increase in close correlation with TH and AAAD upregulation. Enhancement of dopaminergic neurotransmission is observed in the hypothalamus, striatum, ventral tegmental area, nucleus accumbens, and other regions. As such, the key mechanism of the pharmacological activity and psychostimulant effects of bromantane is activation of the de novo synthesis of dopamine via modulation of gene expression.

A selection of quoted excerpts from the medical literature detail the differences between bromantane and typical stimulants:

- "Bromantane [does] not concede well-known psychostimulant of phenylalkylamine structure and its analogs (amphetamine, [mesocarb], [methylphenidate], etc.) by specific activity. In contrast, bromantane has neither addictive potential nor reveals redundant and exhausting activation of sympaticoadrenergic system, or decelerates the restoring of work capacity at preventive application before forthcoming activity in complicated conditions (hypoxia, high environmental temperature, physical overfatigue, emotional stress, etc.). Bromantane has no prohypoxic activity."
- "The use of the drug, in contrast to the action of a typical psychostimulant, is not associated with the phenomenon of hyperstimulation and causes no consequences such as functional exhaustion of the body."
- "Bromantane administration in therapeutic doses is characterized by the almost full absence of side effects including manifestations of withdrawal syndrome and hyperstimulation."
- "[Bromantane] has low peripheral sympathomimetic effects. Moreover, no signs of [bromantane] dependence and withdrawal symptoms were found."

Bromantane is well tolerated and elicits few side effects (including peripheral sympathomimetic effects and hyperstimulation), does not appear to produce tolerance or dependence, has not been associated with withdrawal symptoms upon discontinuation, and displays an absence of addiction potential, contrary to typical stimulants. In accordance with human findings, animals exposed to bromantane for extended periods of time do not appear to develop tolerance or dependence.

The precise direct molecular mechanism of action by which bromantane ultimately acts as a dopamine synthesis enhancer is unknown. However, it has been determined that activation of certain cAMP-, Ca^{2+}-, and phospholipid-dependent protein kinases such as protein kinase A and especially protein kinase C corresponds with the manifestation of the pharmacological effects of bromantane. Bromantane may activate intracellular signaling cascades by some mechanism (e.g., agonizing some as-yet-undetermined receptor) to in turn activate protein kinases, which in turn cause increased transcription of TH and AAAD.

The related drugs amantadine and memantine also have many properties similar to those of bromantane.

Researchers discovered that amantadine and memantine bind to and act as agonists of the σ_{1} receptor (K_{i} = 7.44 μM and 2.60 μM, respectively) and that activation of the σ_{1} receptor is involved in the central dopaminergic effects of amantadine at therapeutically relevant concentrations; the authors of the study stated that this could also be the mechanism of action of bromantane, as it is in the same family of structurally related compounds and evidence suggests a role of dopamine in its effects. But this could also be seen as evidence of the contrary since bromantane has effects that are distinctly different from amantadine and memantine.

==== Monoamine reuptake inhibition ====
Bromantane was once thought to act as a reuptake inhibitor of serotonin and dopamine. While bromantane can inhibit the reuptake of serotonin, dopamine, and to a lesser extent norepinephrine in vitro in rat brain tissue, the concentrations required to do so are extremely high (50–500 μM) and likely not clinically relevant. Although one study found an IC_{50} for dopamine transport of 3.56 μM, relative to 28.66 nM for mesocarb; neither drug affected serotonin transport at the tested concentrations, in contrast. The lack of typical stimulant-like effects and adverse effects seen with bromantane may help corroborate the notion that it is not acting significantly as a monoamine reuptake inhibitor, but rather via a different mechanism.

==== Other actions ====
Bromantane has been found to increase the expression of neurotrophins including brain-derived neurotrophic factor and nerve growth factor in certain rat brain areas.

Although not relevant at clinical dosages, bromantane has been found to produce anticholinergic effects, including both antimuscarinic and antinicotinic actions, at very high doses in animals, and these effects are responsible for its toxicity (that is, LD_{50}) in animals.

=== Pharmacokinetics ===
Bromantane is used clinically in doses of 50 mg to 100 mg per day in the treatment of asthenia.

The main metabolite of bromantane is 6β-hydroxybromantane.

== Chemistry ==
Bromantane is an adamantane derivative. It is also known as adamantylbromphenylamine, from which its name was derived.

Closely related adamantanes with similar effects include adapromine, amantadine, chlodantane, gludantane (gludantan), memantine, and rimantadine.

=== Synthesis ===
Patents: 57%:

The Leuckart reaction between adamantanone and 4-bromoaniline in the presence of formic acid produces bromantane.

== History ==
In the 1960s, the adamantane derivative amantadine (1-aminoadamantane) was developed as an antiviral drug for the treatment of influenza. Other adamantane antivirals subsequently followed, such as rimantadine (1-(1-aminoethyl)adamantane) and adapromine (1-(1-aminopropyl)adamantane). It was serendipitously discovered in 1969 that amantadine possesses central dopaminergic stimulant-like properties, and subsequent investigation revealed that rimantadine and adapromine also possess such properties. Amantadine was then developed and introduced for the treatment of Parkinson's disease due to its ability to increase dopamine levels in the brain. It has also notably since been used to help alleviate fatigue in multiple sclerosis.

With the knowledge of the dopaminergic stimulant effects of the adamantane derivatives, bromantane, which is 2-(4-bromophenylamino) adamantane, was developed in the 1980s at the Zakusov State Institute of Pharmacology, USSR Academy of Medical Sciences (now the Russian Academy of Medical Sciences) in Moscow as "a drug having psychoactivating and adaptogen properties under complicated conditions (hypoxia, high environmental temperature, physical overfatigue, emotional stress, etc.)". It was found to produce more marked and prolonged stimulant effects than the other adamantanes, and eventually entered use. The drug was notably given to soldiers in the Soviet and Russian militaries to "shorten recovery times after strong physical exertion". After the break-up of the Soviet Union in 1991, bromantane continued to be researched and characterized but was mainly limited in use to sports medicine (for instance, to enhance athletic performance). In 1996, it was encountered as a doping agent in the 1996 Summer Olympics when several Russian athletes tested positive for it, and was subsequently placed on the World Anti-Doping Agency banned list in 1997 as a stimulant and masking agent.

Bromantane was eventually repurposed in 2005 as a treatment for neurasthenia. It demonstrated effectiveness and safety for the treatment of the condition in extensive, large-scale clinical trials, and was approved for this indication in Russia under the brand name Ladasten sometime around 2009.

== See also ==
- List of Russian drugs
