= Adamantane =

Molecule with three connected cyclohexane rings arranged in the "armchair" configuration

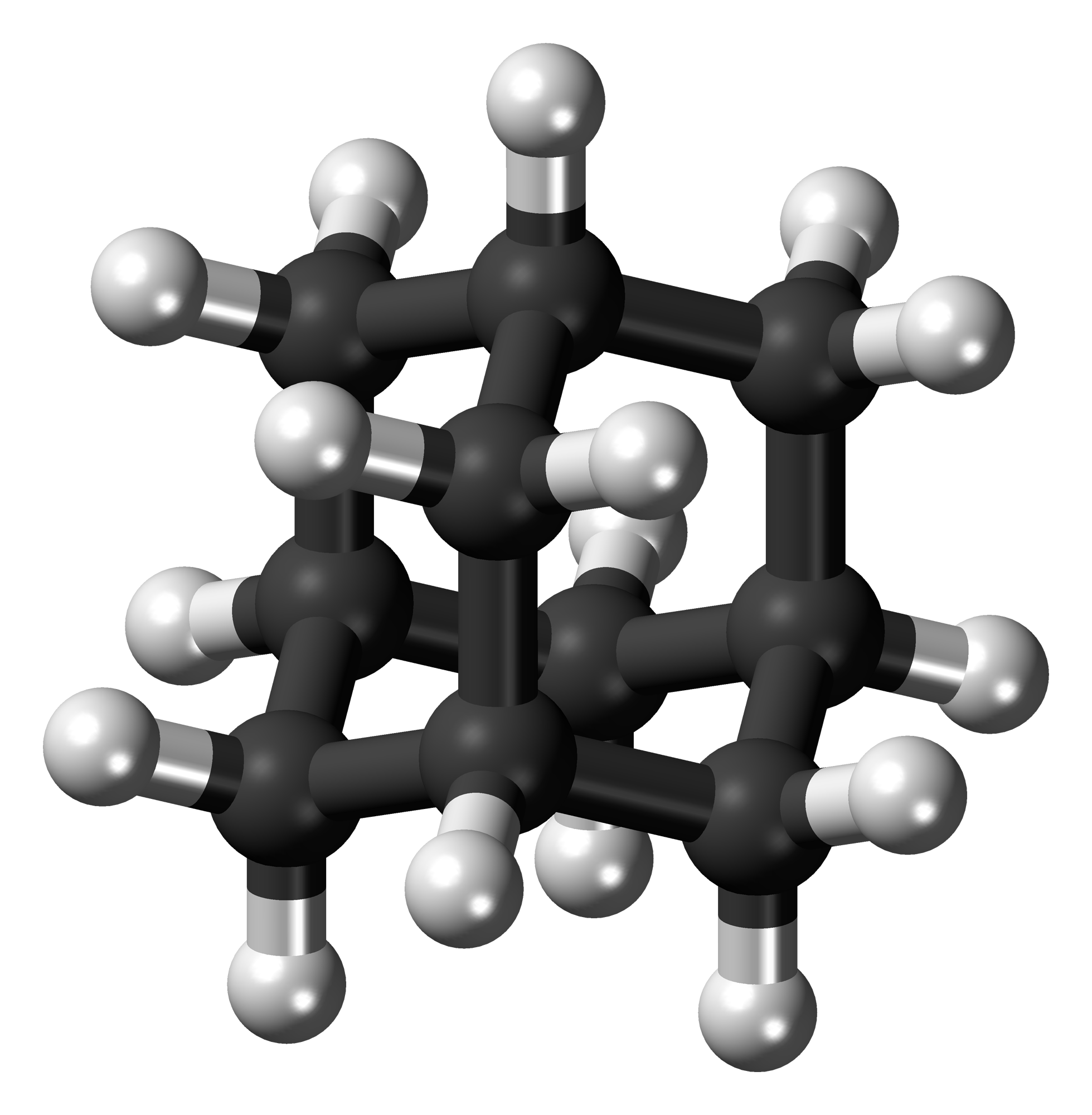

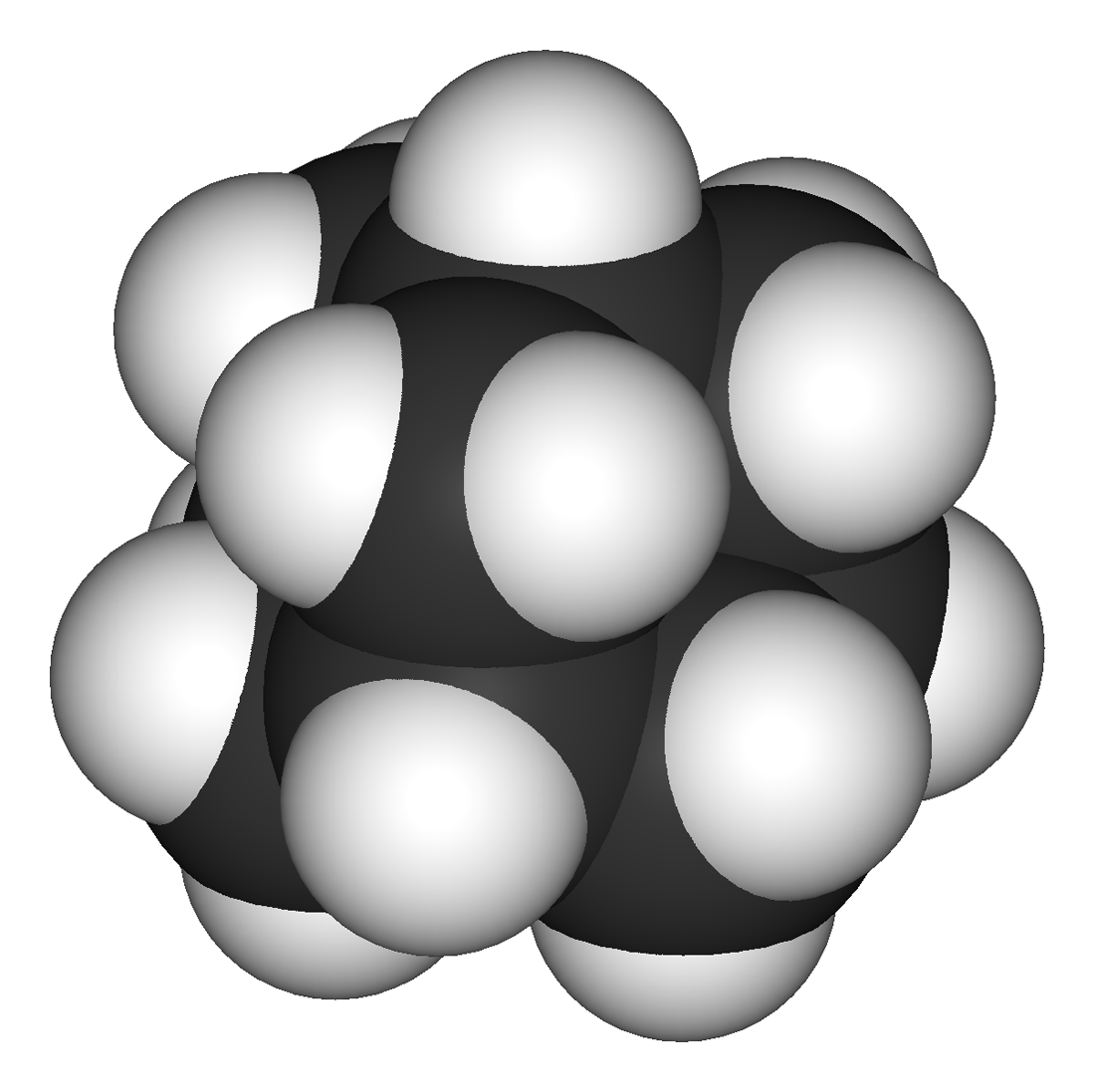

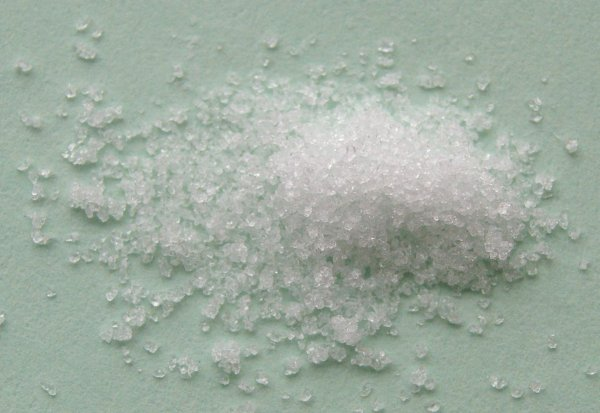

Names
- Preferred IUPAC name Adamantane
- Systematic IUPAC name Tricyclo[3.3.1.1^{3,7}]decane

Identifiers
CAS Number	281-23-2
3D model (JSmol)	Interactive image; Interactive image
Beilstein Reference	1901173
ChEBI	CHEBI:40519
ChEMBL	ChEMBL1614830
ChemSpider	8883
DrugBank	DB03627
ECHA InfoCard	100.005.457
EC Number	206-001-4
Gmelin Reference	26963
PubChem CID	9238
UNII	PJY633525U
CompTox Dashboard (EPA)	DTXSID5022017
- InChI: InChI=1S/C10H16/c1-7-2-9-4-8(1)5-10(3-7)6-9/h7-10H,1-6H2 Key: ORILYTVJVMAKLC-UHFFFAOYSA-N; InChI=1/C10H16/c1-7-2-9-4-8(1)5-10(3-7)6-9/h7-10H,1-6H2 Key: ORILYTVJVMAKLC-UHFFFAOYAG
- SMILES: C1C3CC2CC(CC1C2)C3; C1C2CC3CC1CC(C2)C3

Properties
Chemical formula	C_{10}H_{16}
Molar mass	136.238 g·mol^{−1}
Appearance	White to off-white powder
Density	1.07 g/cm^{3} (25 °C)
Melting point	270 °C (518 °F; 543 K)
Boiling point	Sublimes
Solubility in water	Poorly soluble
Solubility in other solvents	Soluble in hydrocarbons
Refractive index (n_{D})	1.568

Structure
Crystal structure	cubic, space group Fm3m
Coordination geometry	4
Dipole moment	0 D

Hazards
- Occupational safety and health (OHS/OSH)
Main hazards	Flammable
- GHS labelling
Pictograms	(GHS07: Exclamation mark) (GHS09: Environmental hazard)
Signal word	Warning
Hazard statements	H319, H400
Precautionary statements	P264, P273, P280, P305+P351+P338, P337+P313, P391, P501

Related compounds
- Related compounds: Memantine; Rimantadine; Amantadine
- Except where otherwise noted, data are given for materials in their standard state (at 25 °C [77 °F], 100 kPa). verify (what is ?) Infobox references

Adamantane is an organic compound with formula C_{10}H_{16} or, more descriptively, (CH)_{4}(CH_{2})_{6}. Adamantane molecules can be described as the fusion of three cyclohexane rings. The molecule is both rigid and virtually strain-free. Adamantane is the most stable isomer of C_{10}H_{16}. The spatial arrangement of carbon atoms in the adamantane molecule is the same as in the diamond crystal. This similarity led to the name adamantane, which is derived from the Greek adamantinos (relating to steel or diamond). It is a white solid with a camphor-like odor. It is the simplest diamondoid.

The discovery of adamantane in petroleum in 1933 launched a new field of chemistry dedicated to the synthesis and properties of polyhedral organic compounds. Adamantane derivatives have found practical application as drugs, polymeric materials, and thermally stable lubricants.

== History and synthesis ==
In 1924, H. Decker suggested the existence of adamantane, which he called decaterpene.

The first attempted laboratory synthesis was made in 1924 by German chemist Hans Meerwein using the reaction of formaldehyde with diethyl malonate in the presence of piperidine. Instead of adamantane, Meerwein obtained 1,3,5,7-tetracarbomethoxybicyclo[3.3.1]nonane-2,6-dione:

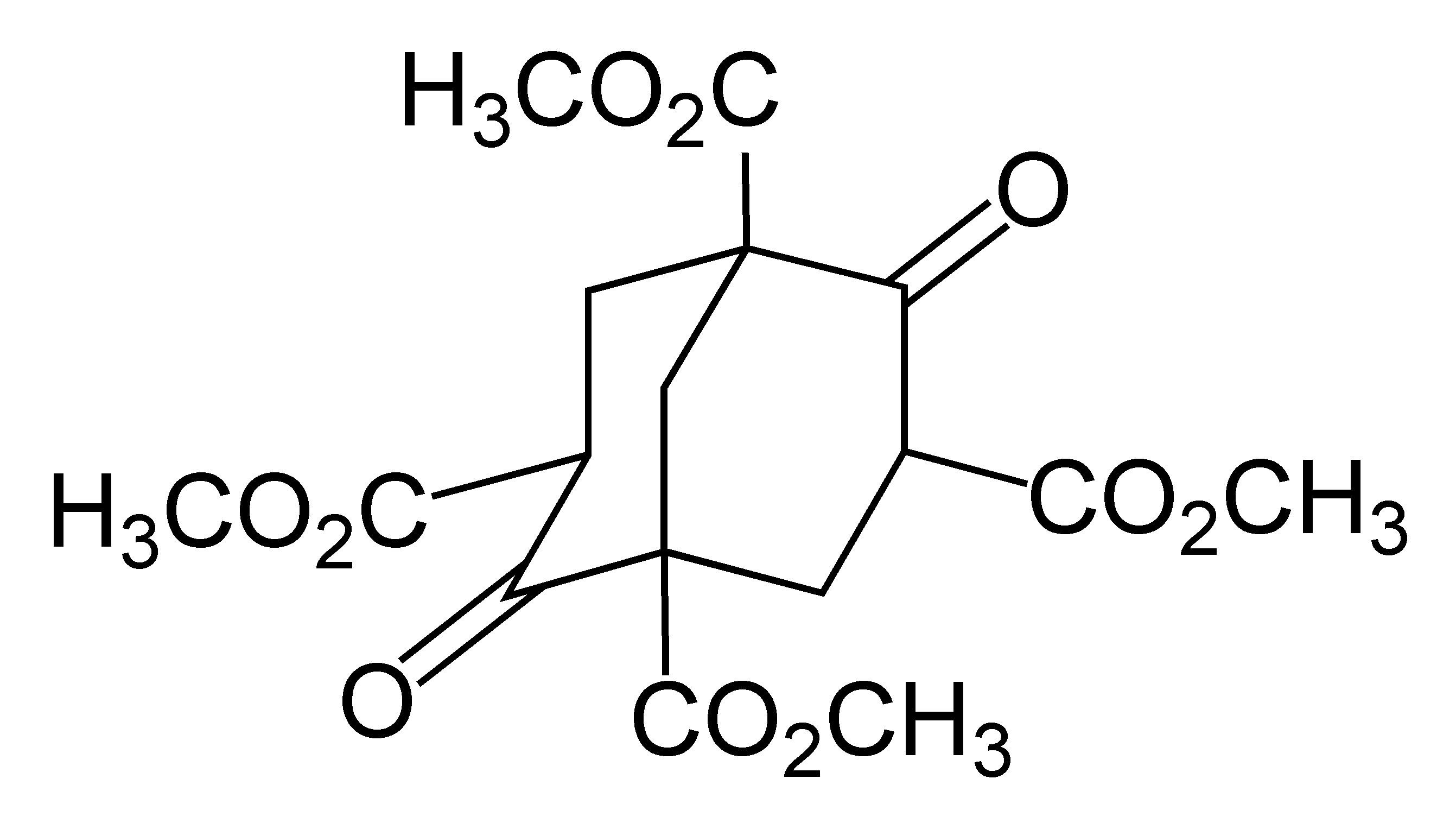
Meerwein's ester

This compound, later named Meerwein's ester, was used in the synthesis of adamantane and its derivatives. D. Böttger tried to obtain adamantane using Meerwein's ester as precursor. The product was not adamantane, but a derivative with a tricyclo[3.3.1.1^{3,7}] ring system.

Other researchers attempted to synthesize adamantane using phloroglucinol and derivatives of cyclohexanone, but also failed.

Adamantane was first synthesized by Vladimir Prelog in 1941 from Meerwein's ester. With a yield of 0.16%, the five-stage process (simplified in the image below) was impractical for commerce. Prelog's method was refined in 1956. The decarboxylation yield was increased by the addition of the Hunsdiecker pathway (11%) and the Hoffman reaction (24%) that raised the total yield to 6.5%:

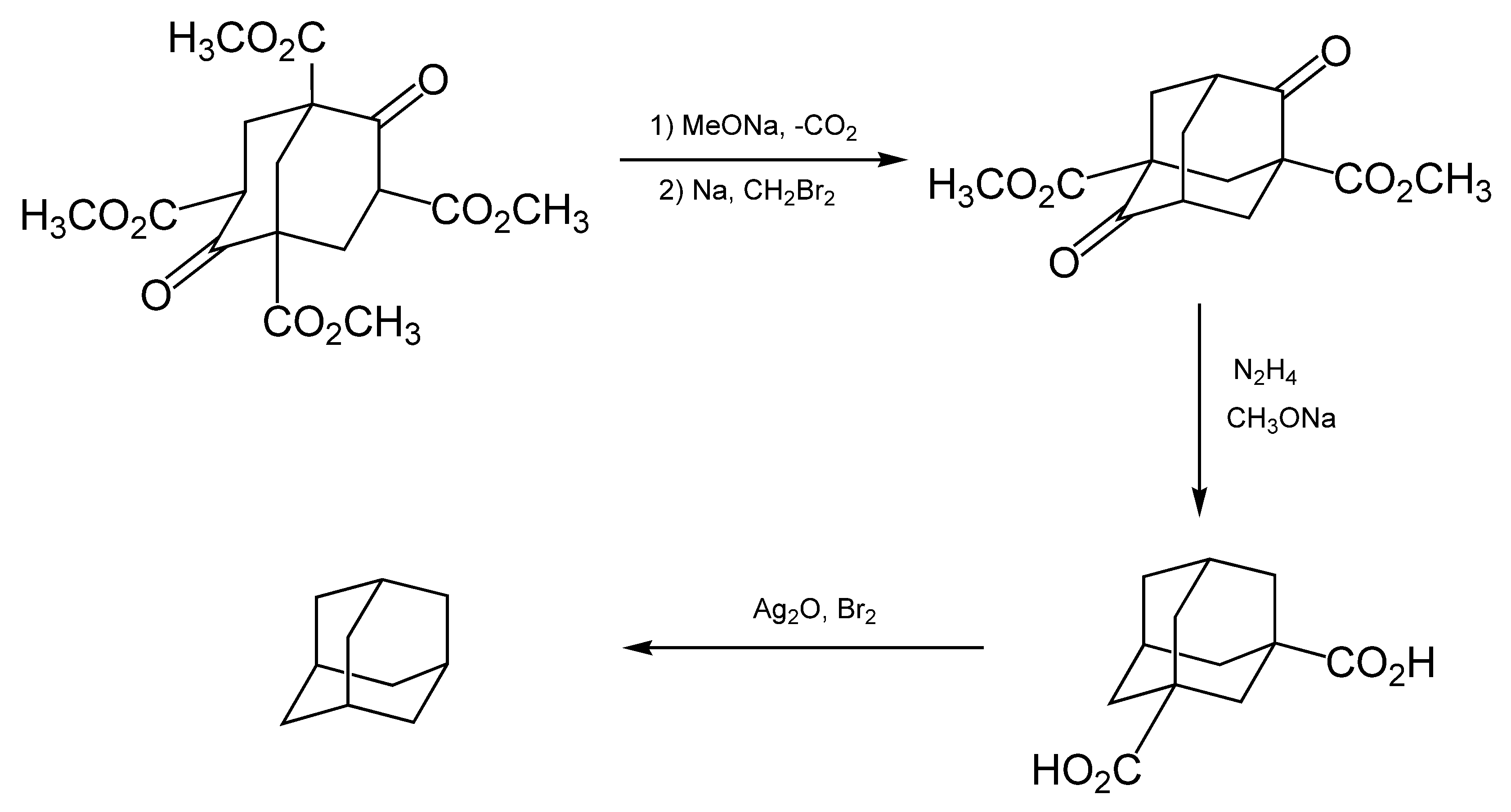

The method is still used to synthesize certain adamantane derivatives.

A more convenient method was found in 1957 by Paul von Ragué Schleyer: dicyclopentadiene was first hydrogenated in the presence of a catalyst (e.g. platinum dioxide) to give tricyclodecane and then transformed into adamantane using a Lewis acid (e.g. aluminium chloride) as another catalyst:

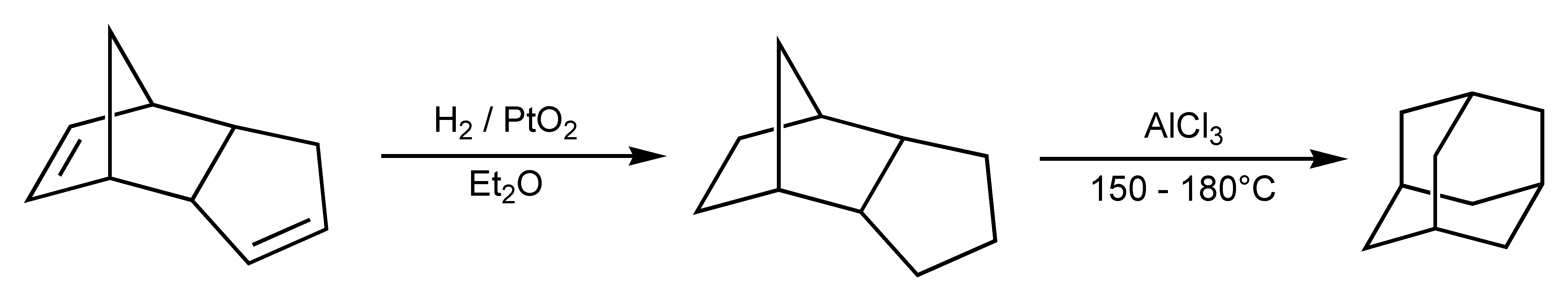

This method increased the yield to 30–40% and provided an affordable source of adamantane; it therefore stimulated characterization of adamantane and is still used in laboratory practice. The process is astonishingly robust: virtually any C_{10}H_{16} alkane feedstock rearranges to adamantane in a strong Lewis acid. The adamantane synthesis yield was later increased to 60% and 98% by ultrasound and superacid catalysis. Today, adamantane is an affordable chemical compound with a cost of about two USD per gram.

All the above methods yield adamantane as a polycrystalline powder. Using this powder, single crystals can be grown from the melt, solution, or vapor phase (e.g. with the Bridgman–Stockbarger technique). Melt growth results in the worst crystalline quality with a mosaic spread in the X-ray reflection of about 1°. The best crystals are obtained from the liquid phase, but the growth is impracticably slow – several months for a 5–10 mm crystal. Growth from the vapor phase is a reasonable compromise in terms of speed and quality. Adamantane is sublimed in a quartz tube placed in a furnace, which is equipped with several heaters maintaining a certain temperature gradient (about 10 °C/cm for adamantane) along the tube. Crystallization starts at one end of the tube, which is kept near the freezing point of adamantane. Slow cooling of the tube, while maintaining the temperature gradient, gradually shifts the melting zone (rate ~2 mm/hour), producing a single-crystal boule.

Ball-and-stick model, black carbon, white hydrogen

== Natural occurrence ==
Adamantane was first isolated from petroleum by the Czech chemist S. Landa with co-workers in the early 1930s. (Note: Announced at the 12th Congress of Industrial Chemistry in 1932; published in 1933.) They used fractional distillation of petroleum. They could produce only a few milligrams of adamantane, but noticed its high boiling and melting points. Because of the (assumed) similarity of its structure to that of diamond, the new compound was named adamantane.

Petroleum remains a source of adamantane; the content varies from between 0.0001% and 0.03% depending on the oil field and is too low for commercial production.

Petroleum contains more than thirty derivatives of adamantane. Their isolation from a complex mixture of hydrocarbons is possible due to their high melting point and the ability to distill with water vapor and form stable adducts with thiourea.

== Physical properties ==
Pure adamantane is a colorless, crystalline solid with a characteristic camphor smell. It is practically insoluble in water, but readily soluble in nonpolar organic solvents. Adamantane has an unusually high melting point for a hydrocarbon. At 270 °C, its melting point is much higher than other hydrocarbons with the same molecular weight, such as camphene (45 °C), limonene (−74 °C), ocimene (50 °C), terpinene (60 °C) or twistane (164 °C), or than a linear C_{10}H_{22} hydrocarbon decane (−28 °C). However, adamantane slowly sublimes even at room temperature. Adamantane can be distilled with water vapor.

=== Structure ===
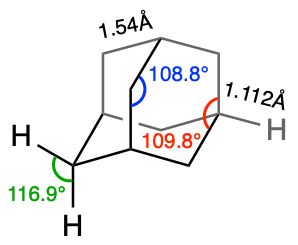
Bond lengths and angles of adamantane.

As deduced by electron diffraction and X-ray crystallography, the molecule has T_{d} symmetry. The carbon–carbon bond lengths are 1.54 Å, almost identical to that of diamond. The carbon–hydrogen distances are 1.112 Å.

At ambient conditions, adamantane crystallizes in a face-centered cubic structure (space group Fm3m, a = 9.426 ± 0.008 Å, four molecules in the unit cell) containing orientationally disordered adamantane molecules. This structure transforms into an ordered, primitive, tetragonal phase (a = 6.641 Å, c = 8.875 Å) with two molecules per cell, either upon cooling to 208 K or pressurizing to above 0.5 GPa.

This phase transition is of the first order; it is accompanied by an anomaly in the heat capacity, elastic, and other properties. In particular, whereas adamantane molecules freely rotate in the cubic phase, they are frozen in the tetragonal one; the density increases stepwise from 1.08 to 1.18 g/cm^{3}, and the entropy changes by a significant amount of 1594 J/(mol·K).

=== Hardness ===
Elastic constants of adamantane were measured using large (centimeter-sized) single crystals and the ultrasonic echo technique. The principal value of the elasticity tensor, C_{11}, was deduced as 7.52, 8.20, and 6.17 GPa for the <110>, <111>, and <100> crystalline directions. For comparison, the corresponding values for crystalline diamond are 1161, 1174, and 1123 GPa. The arrangement of carbon atoms is the same in adamantane and diamond; however, in the adamantane solid, molecules do not form a covalent lattice as in diamond, but interact through weak van der Waals forces. As a result, adamantane crystals are very soft and plastic.

=== Spectroscopy ===
The nuclear magnetic resonance (NMR) spectrum of adamantane consists of two poorly resolved signals, which correspond to sites 1 and 2 (see picture below). The ^{1}H and ^{13}C NMR chemical shifts are respectively 1.873 and 1.756 ppm and are 28.46 and 37.85 ppm. The simplicity of these spectra is consistent with high molecular symmetry.

Mass spectra of adamantane and its derivatives are rather characteristic. The main peak at m/z = 136 corresponds to the C_{10}H^{+}_{16} ion. Its fragmentation results in weaker signals as m/z = 93, 80, 79, 67, 41 and 39.

The infrared absorption spectrum of adamantane is relatively simple because of the high symmetry of the molecule. The main absorption bands and their assignment are given in the table:

Wavenumber, cm^{−1}	Assignment^{*}
444	δ(CCC)
638	δ(CCC)
798	ν(C−C)
970	ρ(CH_{2}), ν(C−C), δ(HCC)
1103	δ(HCC)
1312	ν(C−C), ω(CH_{2})
1356	δ(HCC), ω(CH_{2})
1458	δ(HCH)
2850	ν(C−H) in CH_{2} groups
2910	ν(C−H) in CH_{2} groups
2930	ν(C−H) in CH_{2} groups

^{*} Legends correspond to types of oscillations: δ – deformation, ν – stretching, ρ and ω – out of plane deformation vibrations of CH_{2} groups.

=== Optical activity ===
Adamantane derivatives with different substituents at every nodal carbon sites are chiral. Such optical activity was described in adamantane in 1969 with the four different substituents being hydrogen, bromine, methyl, and carboxyl. The values of specific rotation are small and are usually within 1°.

== Nomenclature ==
Using the rules of systematic nomenclature, adamantane is called tricyclo[3.3.1.1^{3,7}]decane. However, IUPAC recommends using the name "adamantane".

The adamantane molecule is composed of only carbon and hydrogen and has T_{d} symmetry. Therefore, its 16 hydrogen and 10 carbon atoms can be described by only two sites, which are labeled in the figure as 1 (4 equivalent sites) and 2 (6 equivalent sites).

Structural relatives of adamantane are noradamantane and homoadamantane, which respectively contain one less and one more CH_{2} link than the adamantane.

The functional group derived from adamantane is adamantyl, formally named as 1-adamantyl or 2-adamantyl depending on which site is connected to the parent molecule. Adamantyl groups are a bulky pendant group used to improve the thermal and mechanical properties of polymers.

== Chemical properties ==
The chemistry of adamantane is dominated by the stability of the tertiary adamantanium cation, C_{10}H^{+}_{15}, itself isolable when treating 1‑fluoroadamantane with SbF_{5}.

Radical reactions of adamantane also occur preferentially at the bridgehead due to steric hindrance. For example, sulfoxidation gives exclusively 1-adamantanesulfonic acid.

=== Bridgehead reactions ===
Adamantanium's stability eases S_{N,1} substitution for 1‑adamantane derivatives. Thus 1‑bromoadamantane hydrolyzes in acid to 1‑hydroxyadamantane, and the latter fluorolyzes to 1‑fluoroadamantane. 1‑Hydroxyadamantane also alkylates activated arenes without a catalyst, and the drug amantadine can be prepared in a Ritter reaction with acetonitrile:

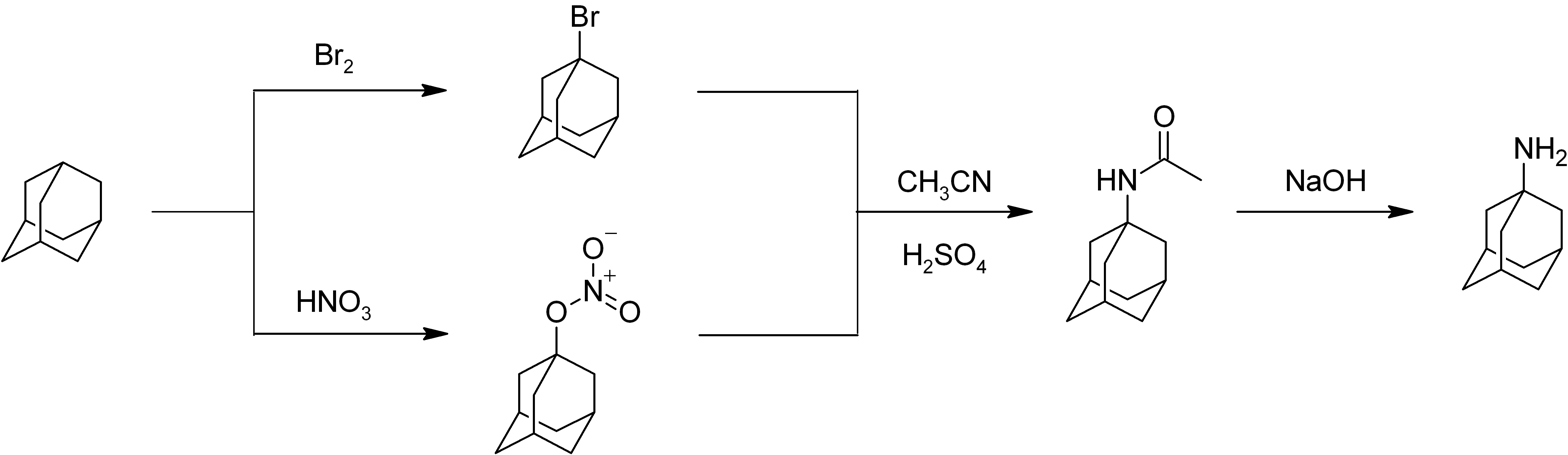

With unsubstituted adamantane, strong Brønsted acids and other comparable electrophiles abstract a hydride equivalent from a bridgehead. For example, nitrosyl salts or an applied voltage oxidize adamantane to the cation intermediate. Under most conditions, the resulting adamantanium cation then attacks nearby nucleophiles, for a net substitution. Ozonation gives the alcohol:

Adamantane also reacts with less exotic reagents.

Various brominators, including molecular bromine, react via an ionic pathway, and similar reactions are possible with gaseous fluorine (but chlorination is likely a radical reaction). The reaction products depend on the conditions, especially the presence and type of catalysis. Boiling adamantane with bromine results in a monosubstituted adamantane, 1-bromadamantane. Multiple substitution is achieved with a Lewis acid:

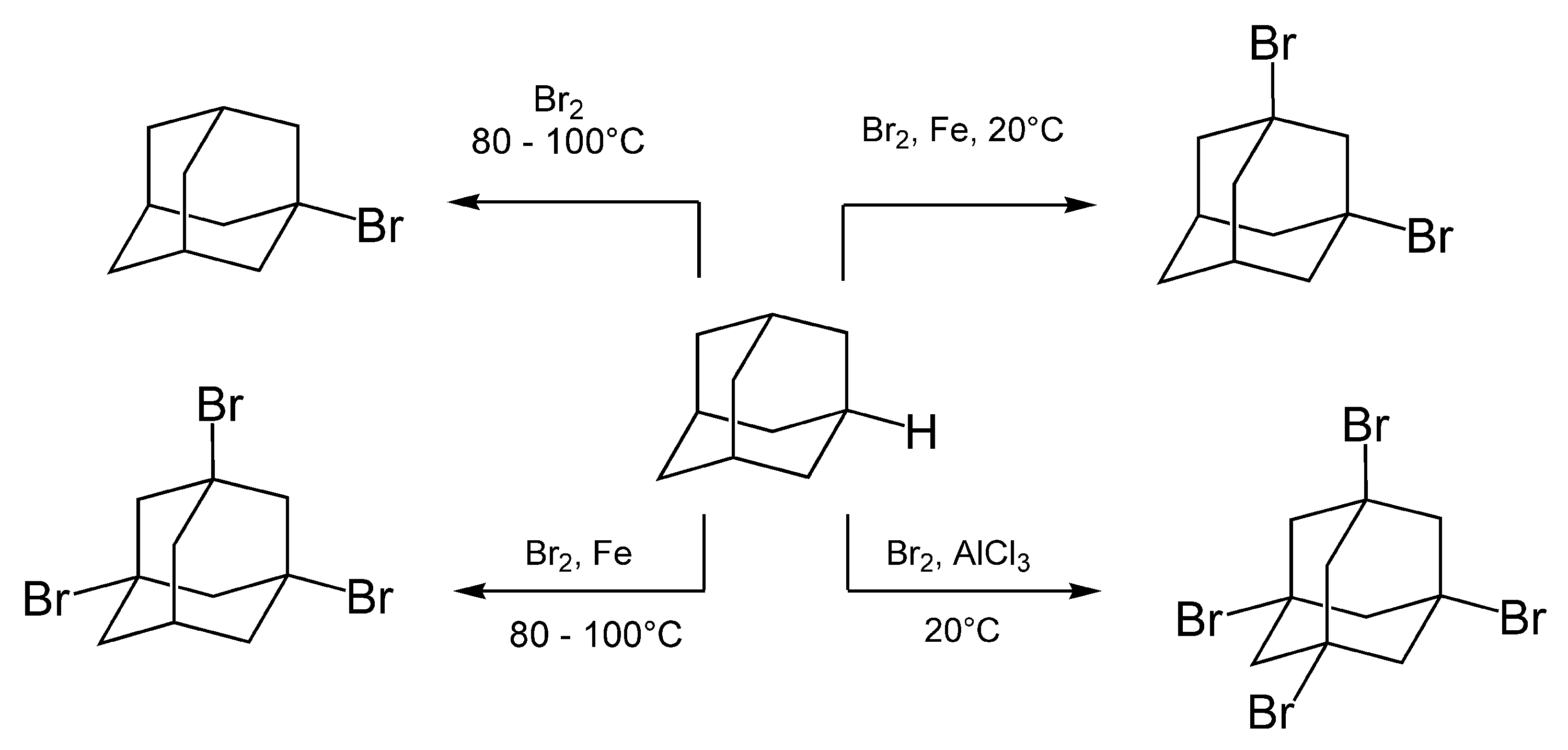

The rate of bromination is accelerated upon addition of Lewis acids and is unchanged by irradiation or addition of free radicals.

Adamantane undergoes Koch-Haaf carboxylation with formic acid to give 1-adamantanecarboxylic acid...

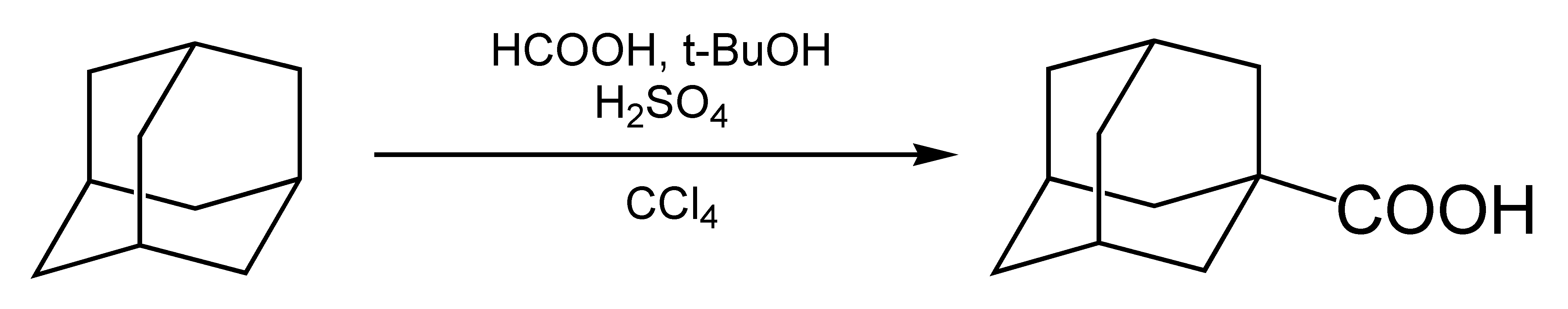

...and a Scholl-type arylation with benzene and acidic clay.

Nitration of adamantane is a difficult reaction characterized by moderate yields. Direct nitration occurs best in glacial acetic acid.

=== Substitution at bridging carbons ===
Adamantane oxidizes in concentrated sulfuric acid to 2‑adamantanone:

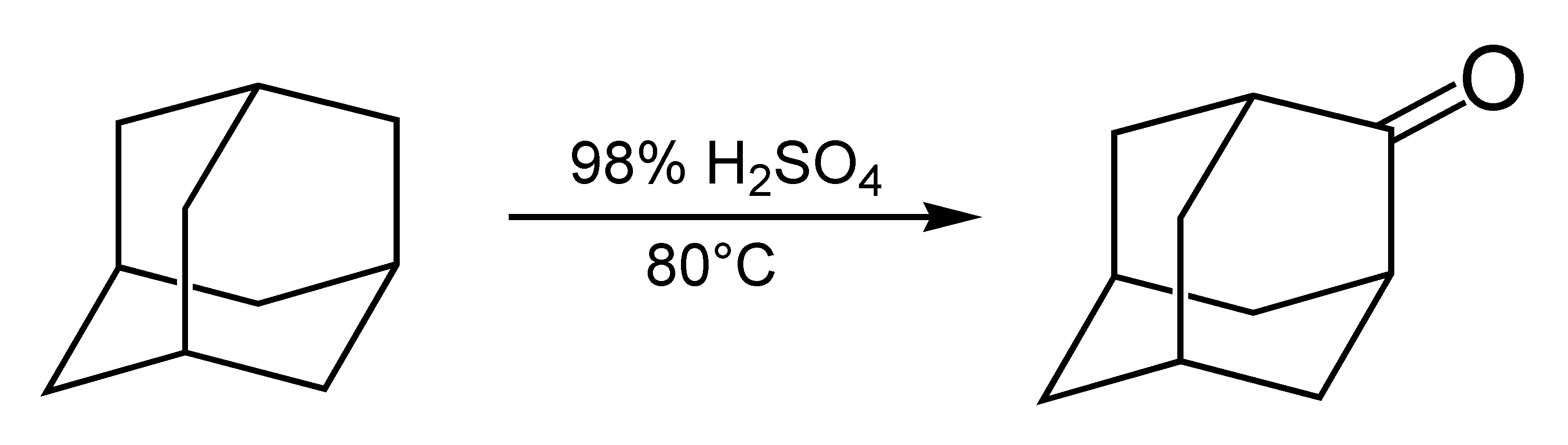

Even though the end product is unsubstituted at the bridgeheads, they are mechanistically involved. A bridgehead cation forms initially before undergoing intermolecular hydride transfer.

Cations formed at a bridging carbon appear to equilibrate with a protoadamantyl cation: a ring expansion/contraction exchanges the roles of a neighboring bridgehead and the cationic center. Indeed, if an adamantane bridgehead carbon is substituted to stabilize a positive charge, then cation formation along the bridges causes a semipinacol rearrangement. Such processes can be reversed to substitute at multiple bridging carbons at simultaneously.

The carbonyl group of adamantanone is less reactive than most cyclic carbonyls, since (by symmetry) any adduct suffers from axial strain. Nevertheless, sufficiently reactive reagents (e.g. alkyllithiums instead of Grignard reagents) allow further functionalization at the bridging site. For example, adamantanone is the starting compound for 2-adamantanecarbonitrile and 2-methyl-adamantane.

== Uses ==
Adamantane itself enjoys few applications since it is merely an unfunctionalized hydrocarbon. It is used in some dry etching masks and polymer formulations.

In solid-state NMR spectroscopy, adamantane is a common standard for chemical shift referencing.

In dye lasers, adamantane may be used to extend the life of the gain medium; it cannot be photoionized under atmosphere because its absorption bands lie in the vacuum-ultraviolet region of the spectrum. Photoionization energies have been determined for adamantane as well as for several bigger diamondoids.

=== In medicine ===
All medical applications known so far involve not pure adamantane, but its derivatives. The first adamantane derivative used as a drug was amantadine – first (1967) as an antiviral drug against various strains of influenza and then to treat Parkinson's disease. Other drugs among adamantane derivatives include adapalene, adapromine, bromantane (bromantan), carmantadine, chlodantane (chlodantan), dopamantine, gludantan (gludantane), hemantane (hymantane), idramantone (kemantane), memantine, nitromemantine, rimantadine, saxagliptin, somantadine, tromantadine, and vildagliptin. Polymers of adamantane have been patented as antiviral agents against HIV.

Influenza virus strains have developed drug resistance to amantadine and rimantadine, which are not effective against prevalent strains as of 2016.

Adapalene

Adapromine

Amantadine

Bromantane

Memantine

Rimantadine

Saxagliptin

Tromantadine

Vildagliptin

=== In designer drugs ===
Adamantane was recently identified as a key structural subunit in several synthetic cannabinoid designer drugs, namely AB-001 and SDB-001.

=== Spacecraft propellant ===
Adamantane is an attractive candidate for propellant in Hall-effect thrusters because it ionizes easily, can be stored in solid form rather than a heavy pressure tank, and is relatively nontoxic.

=== Potential technological applications ===
Some alkyl derivatives of adamantane have been used as a working fluid in hydraulic systems. Adamantane-based polymers might find application for coatings of touchscreens, and there are prospects for using adamantane and its homologues in nanotechnology. For example, the soft cage-like structure of adamantane solid allows incorporation of guest molecules, which can be released inside the human body upon breaking the matrix. Adamantane could be used as molecular building blocks for self-assembly of molecular crystals.

== Adamantane analogues ==
Many molecules and ions adopt adamantane-like cage structures. Those include phosphorus trioxide P_{4}O_{6}, arsenic trioxide As_{4}O_{6}, phosphorus pentoxide P_{4}O_{10} = (PO)_{4}O_{6}, phosphorus pentasulfide P_{4}S_{10} = (PS)_{4}S_{6}, and hexamethylenetetramine C_{6}N_{4}H_{12} = N_{4}(CH_{2})_{6}. Particularly notorious is tetramethylenedisulfotetramine, often shortened to "tetramine", a rodenticide banned in most countries for extreme toxicity to humans. The silicon analogue of adamantane, sila-adamantane, was synthesized in 2005. Arsenicin A is a naturally occurring organoarsenic chemical isolated from the New Caledonian sea sponge Echinochalina bargibanti and is the first known heterocycle to contain multiple arsenic atoms.

Adamantane

Hexamethylenetetramine

Phosphorus pentoxide

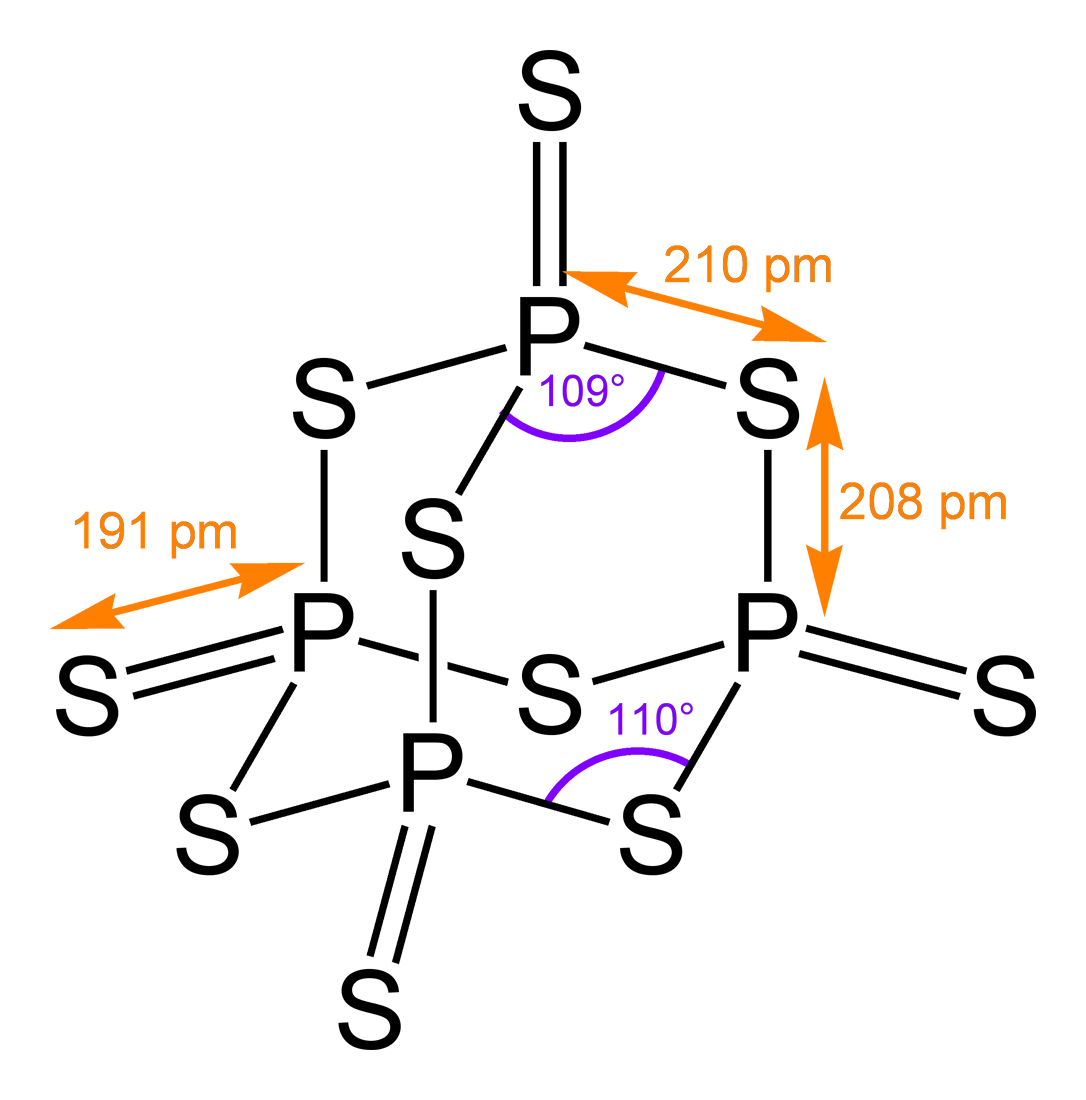
Phosphorus pentasulfide

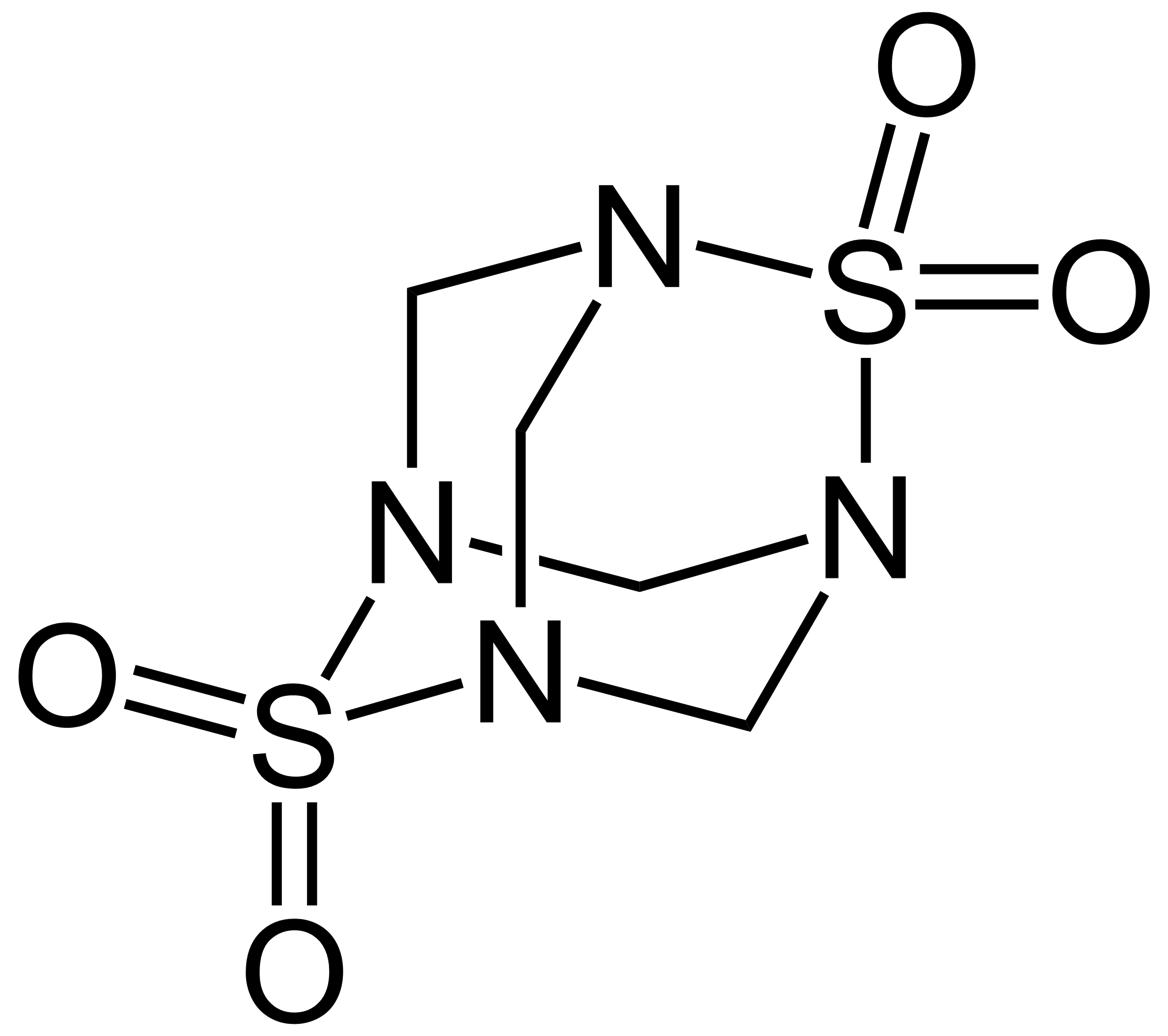
Tetramethylenedisulfotetramine

Tetrodotoxin

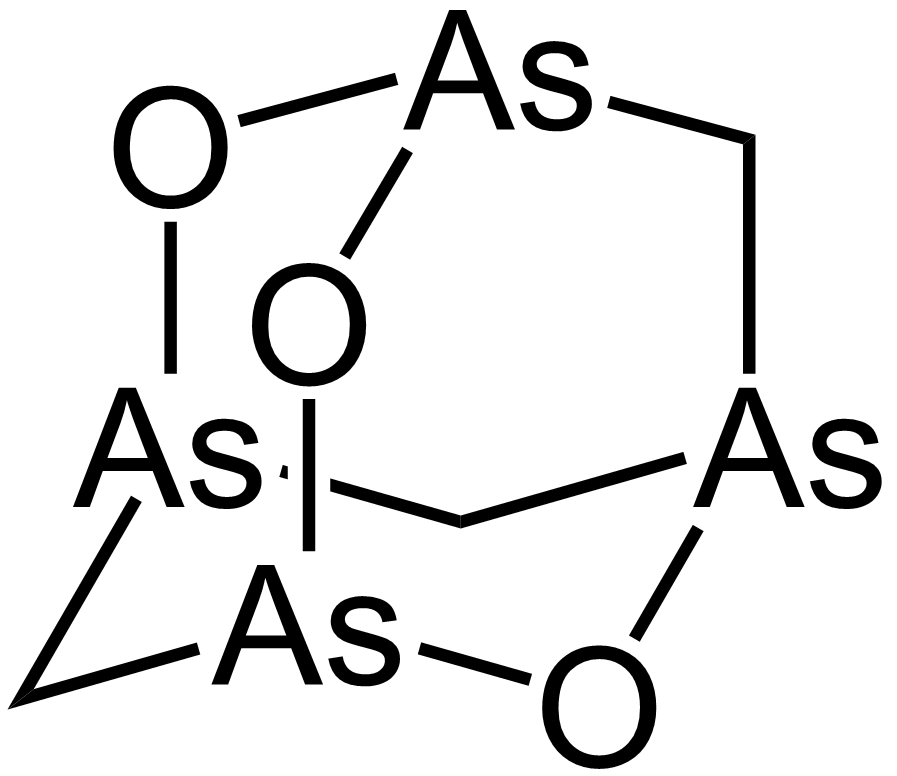
Arsenicin A

Conjoining adamantane cages produces higher diamondoids, such as diamantane (C_{14}H_{20} – two fused adamantane cages), triamantane (C_{18}H_{24}), tetramantane (C_{22}H_{28}), pentamantane (C_{26}H_{32}), hexamantane (C_{26}H_{30}), etc. Their synthesis is similar to that of adamantane and like adamantane, they can also be extracted from petroleum, though at even much smaller yields.

The related dication of 1,3-didehydroadamantane also has elevated stability due to the phenomenon called "three-dimensional aromaticity" or homoaromaticity. This four-center two-electron bond involves one pair of electrons delocalized among the four bridgehead atoms:

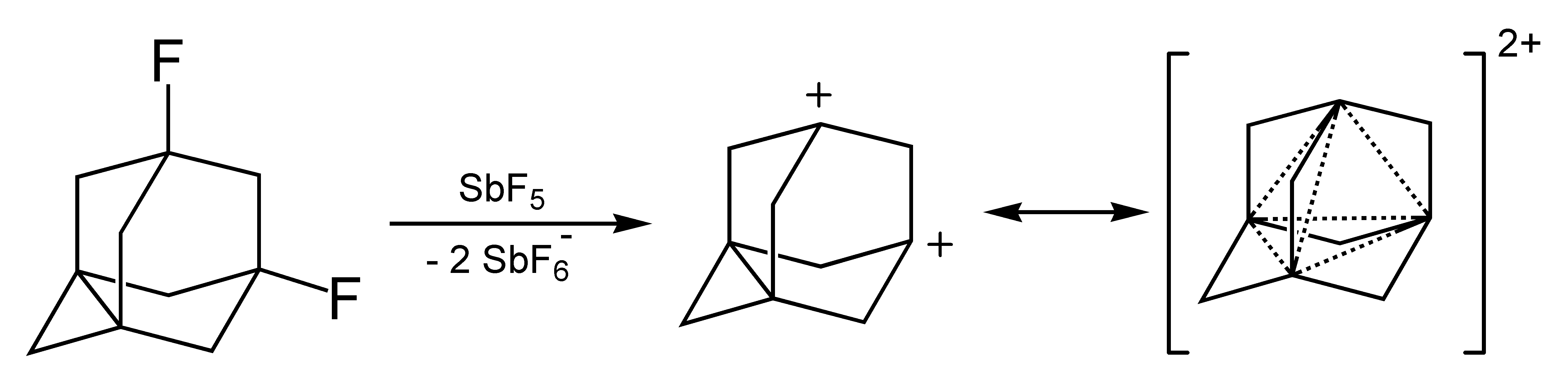
