= Four-center two-electron bond =

Type of chemical bond

A 4-center 2-electron (4c–2e) bond is a type of chemical bond in which four atoms share two electrons in bonding, with a net bond order of 1/2. This type of bonding differs from the usual covalent bond, which involves two atoms sharing two electrons (2c–2e bonding).

Four-center two-electron bonding is postulated in certain cluster compounds. For instance, the borane B_{6}H^{−}_{7} anion is a B_{6}H^{2−}_{6} octahedron with an additional proton attached to one of the triangular faces. As a result, the octahedron is distorted and a B–B–B–H rhomboid ring can be identified in which this 4c–2e bonding takes place. This type of bonding is associated with electron deficient rhomboid rings in general and is a relatively new research field, fitting in with the already well established three-center two-electron bond.

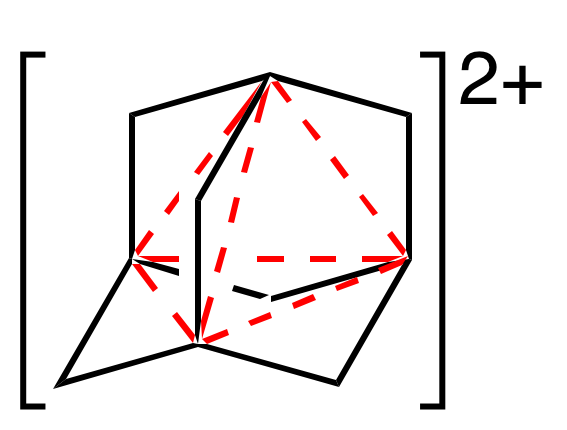
Adamantyl dication

An example of a purely organic compound with four-center two-electron bonding is the adamantyl dication. The bond joins the four bridgehead atoms in a tetrahedral geometry.

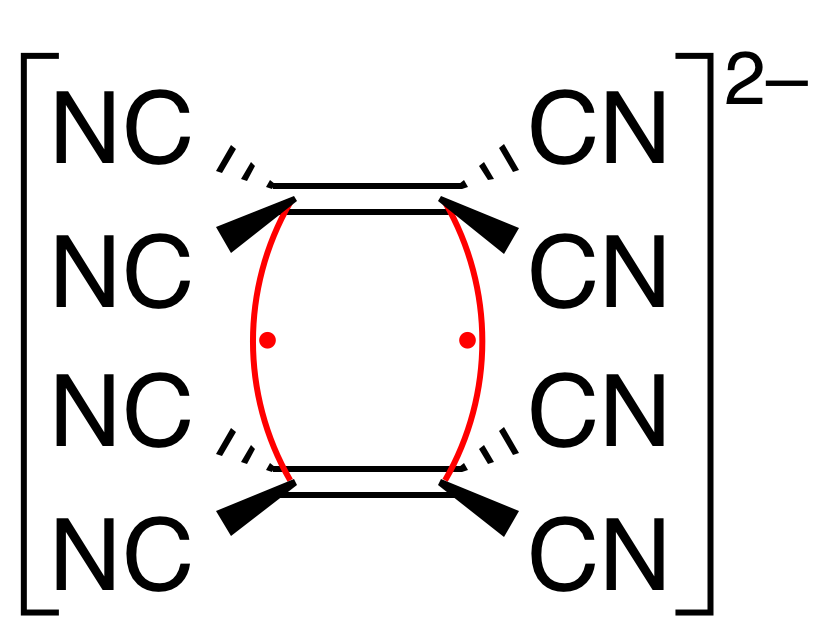
Tetracyanoethylene dianion

Tetracyanoethylene forms a dianionic dimer in which the two alkenes are joined face-to-face by a rectangular four-center two-electron bond. Various solid salts of this dianion have been studied to determine bond strengths and vibrational spectroscopic details.
