= Chlodantane =

Adaptogen drug that was never marketed

Clinical data
- Other names: ADK-910; Chlodantan; N-(2-Adamantyl)-N-(para-chlorobenzoyl)amine; 2-(para-Chlorobenzoylamino)adamantane

Identifiers
- IUPAC name: N-(2-adamantyl)-4-chlorobenzamide
- CAS Number: 185384-80-9
- PubChem CID: 959689
- ChemSpider: 832832

Chemical and physical data
- Formula: C_{17}H_{20}ClNO
- Molar mass: 289.80 g·mol^{−1}
- 3D model (JSmol): Interactive image
- SMILES: C1C2CC3CC1CC(C2)C3NC(=O)C4=CC=C(C=C4)Cl
- InChI: InChI=1S/C17H20ClNO/c18-15-3-1-12(2-4-15)17(20)19-16-13-6-10-5-11(8-13)9-14(16)7-10/h1-4,10-11,13-14,16H,5-9H2,(H,19,20); Key:VOHIYJJUKAUCCU-UHFFFAOYSA-N

Chlodantane (developmental code name ADK-910) is a drug described as an adaptogen or actoprotector "of the estrogen activity type" that was developed in Russia and was never marketed. It is an adamantane derivative and is closely related to bromantane (N-(2-adamantyl)-N-(para-bromophenyl)amine) and other adamantanes. It has been said to improve physical performance. However, only animal or cell culture research has been conducted and it has not been studied in humans. The drug is described as having a broader spectrum of activity than bromantane. It also has immunostimulant effects that are said to be more pronounced than those of bromantane.

== See also ==
- List of Russian drugs
