= Gludantan =

Antiparkinsonian agent of the adamantane group that was never marketed

Clinical data
- Other names: Gludantane; N-Adamantan-1-yl-β-D-glucopyranuronosylamine

Identifiers
- IUPAC name: (2S,3S,4S,5R,6R)-6-(1-adamantylamino)-3,4,5-trihydroxyoxane-2-carboxylic acid
- CAS Number: 12707-95-8
- PubChem CID: 9996542
- PubChem SID: 274134074
- ChemSpider: 8172123

Chemical and physical data
- Formula: C_{16}H_{25}NO_{6}
- Molar mass: 327.377 g·mol^{−1}
- 3D model (JSmol): Interactive image
- SMILES: C1C2CC3CC1CC(C2)(C3)N[C@H]4[C@@H]([C@H]([C@@H]([C@H](O4)C(=O)O)O)O)O
- InChI: InChI=1S/C16H25NO6/c18-10-11(19)13(15(21)22)23-14(12(10)20)17-16-4-7-1-8(5-16)3-9(2-7)6-16/h7-14,17-20H,1-6H2,(H,21,22)/t7?,8?,9?,10-,11-,12+,13-,14+,16?/m0/s1; Key:CORMWKGBVDLTGH-KIBBNWRDSA-N

Gludantan, or gludantane, is an experimental antiparkinsonian agent of the aminoadamantane group that was never marketed. It has also been described as a "psychotropic" and antidepressant. An analogue of gludantan, N-3,5-dimethylgludantan, is an inactive metabolite of memantine. Gludantan was developed in the Soviet Union and was first described by 1974.

== See also ==
- Hemantane
- List of Russian drugs
