= 1-Adamantanecarboxylic acid =

Names
- Preferred IUPAC name Adamantane-1-carboxylic acid
- Other names 1-Adamantane carboxylic acid

Identifiers
CAS Number	828-51-3
3D model (JSmol)	Interactive image
ChEMBL	ChEMBL170568
ChemSpider	12680
ECHA InfoCard	100.011.440
EC Number	212-584-6
PubChem CID	13235
CompTox Dashboard (EPA)	DTXSID40870784
- InChI: InChI=1S/C11H16O2/c12-10(13)11-4-7-1-8(5-11)3-9(2-7)6-11/h7-9H,1-6H2,(H,12,13) Key: JIMXXGFJRDUSRO-UHFFFAOYSA-N
- SMILES: C1C2CC3CC1CC(C2)(C3)C(=O)O

Properties
Chemical formula	C_{11}H_{16}O_{2}
Molar mass	180.247 g·mol^{−1}
Appearance	white solid
Melting point	175–176.5 °C (347.0–349.7 °F; 448.1–449.6 K)

Related compounds
Related compounds	2-Adamantanecarboxylic acid
- Except where otherwise noted, data are given for materials in their standard state (at 25 °C [77 °F], 100 kPa). Infobox references

1-Adamantanecarboxylic acid is an organic compound with the formula (CH_{2})_{6}(CH)_{3}(CCO_{2}H). A white solid, it is the simplest carboxylic acid derivative of adamantane. The compound is notable for its synthesis by carboxylation of adamantane. 1-Adamantanecarboxylic acid is unusual in forming mononuclear tris(carboxylate) coordination complexes of the formula [M(O_{2}CR)_{3}]^{−} (M = Mn, Ni, Co, Zn).

== See also ==
- 1,3,5,7-Adamantanetetracarboxylic acid
