= Rimantadine =

Drug used to treat influenzavirus A infection

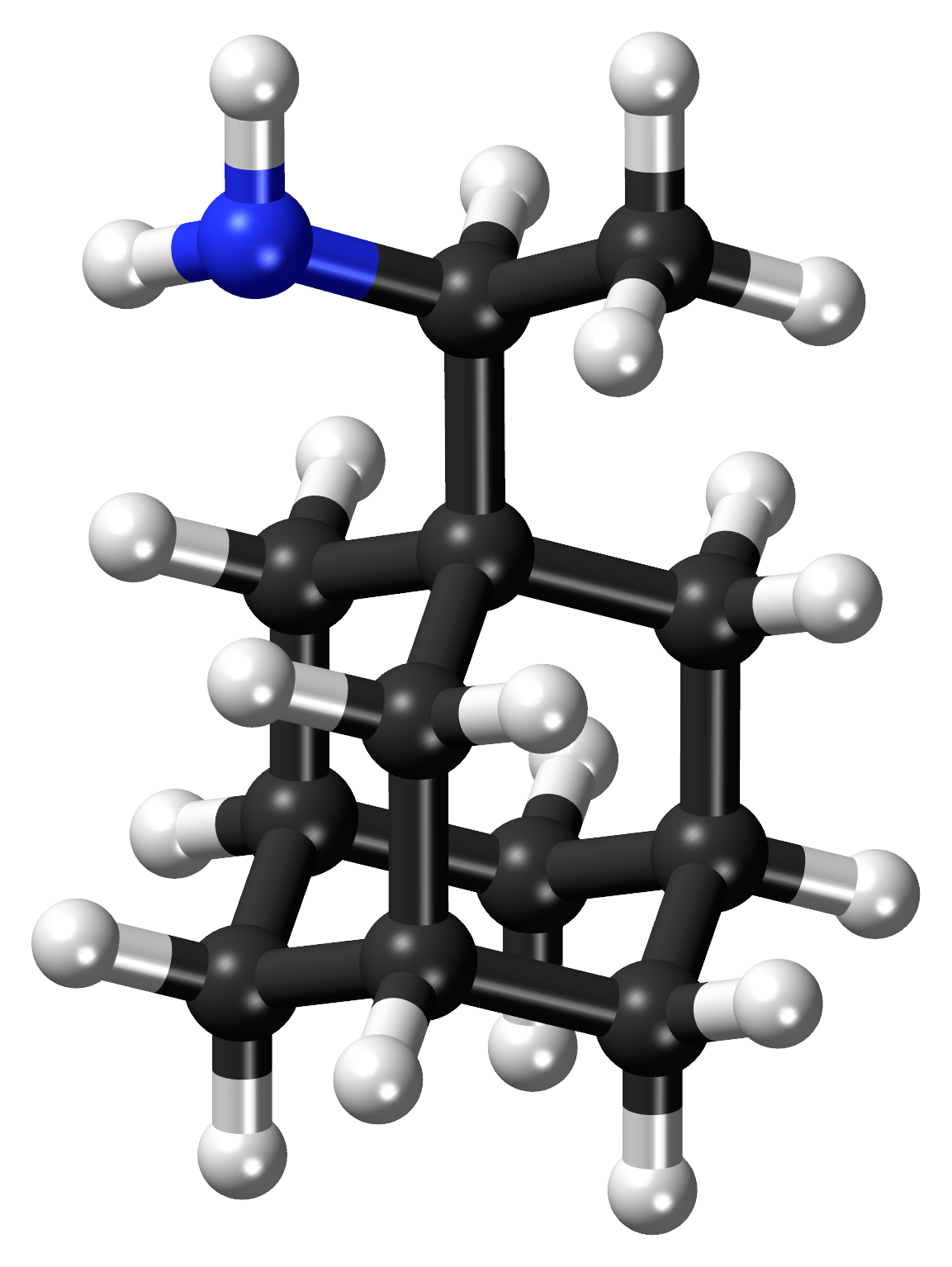

Clinical data
- Trade names: Flumadine
- AHFS/Drugs.com: Monograph
- MedlinePlus: a698029
- Pregnancy category: C (United States)
- Routes of administration: Oral
- ATC code: J05AC02 (WHO)

Legal status
- Legal status: US: ℞-only

Pharmacokinetic data
- Bioavailability: well absorbed
- Protein binding: 40%
- Metabolism: Hepatic hydroxylation and glucuronidation
- Elimination half-life: 25.4 ± 6.3 hours
- Excretion: Renal

Identifiers
- IUPAC name: 1-(adamantanyl)ethanamine
- CAS Number: 13392-28-4
- PubChem CID: 5071
- DrugBank: DB00478
- ChemSpider: 4893
- UNII: 0T2EF4JQTU
- KEGG: D08483
- ChEMBL: ChEMBL959
- PDB ligand: RIM (PDBe, RCSB PDB)
- CompTox Dashboard (EPA): DTXSID2023561

Chemical and physical data
- Formula: C_{12}H_{21}N
- Molar mass: 179.307 g·mol^{−1}
- 3D model (JSmol): Interactive image
- Chirality: Racemic mixture
- SMILES: NC(C)C13CC2CC(CC(C1)C2)C3
- InChI: InChI=1S/C12H21N/c1-8(13)12-5-9-2-10(6-12)4-11(3-9)7-12/h8-11H,2-7,13H2,1H3; Key:UBCHPRBFMUDMNC-UHFFFAOYSA-N

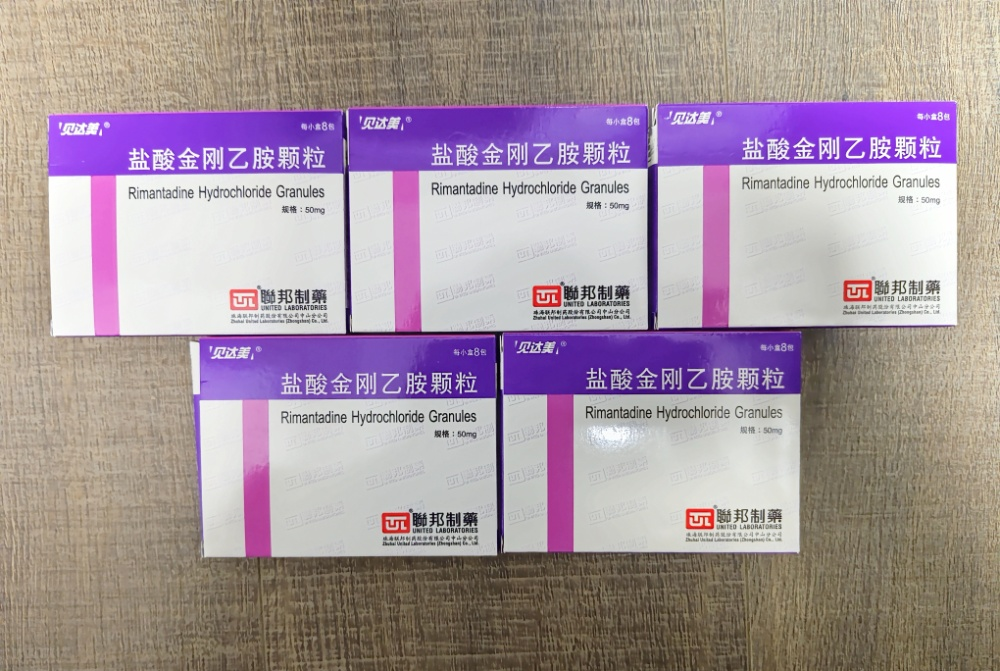
Rimantadine hydrochloride granules sold in mainland China

Rimantadine (INN, sold under the trade name Flumadine) is an orally administered antiviral drug used to treat, and in rare cases prevent, influenzavirus A infection. When taken within one to two days of developing symptoms, rimantadine can shorten the duration and moderate the severity of influenza. Rimantadine can mitigate symptoms, including fever. Both rimantadine and the similar drug amantadine are derivates of adamantane. Rimantadine is found to be more effective than amantadine because when used the patient displays fewer symptoms. Rimantadine was approved by the Food and Drug Administration (FDA) in 1994.

Rimantadine was approved for medical use in 1993. Seasonal H3N2 and 2009 pandemic flu samples tested have shown resistance to rimantadine, and it is no longer recommended to prescribe for treatment of the flu.

== Medical uses ==
=== Influenza A ===
Rimantadine inhibits influenza activity by binding to amino acids in the M2 transmembrane channel and blocking proton transport across the M2 channel. Rimantadine is believed to inhibit influenza's viral replication, possibly by preventing the uncoating of the virus's protective shells, which are the envelope and capsid. The M2 channel is known to be responsible for viral replication in the influenza virus. Genetic studies suggest that the virus M2 protein, an ion channel specified by virion M2 gene, plays an important role in the susceptibility of influenza A virus to inhibition by rimantadine.

Rimantadine is bound inside the pore to amantadine specific amino acid binding sites with hydrogen binding and van der Waals interactions. The ammonium group (with neighboring water molecules) is positioned towards the C terminus with the amantadane group is positioned towards the N-terminus when bound inside the M2 pore.

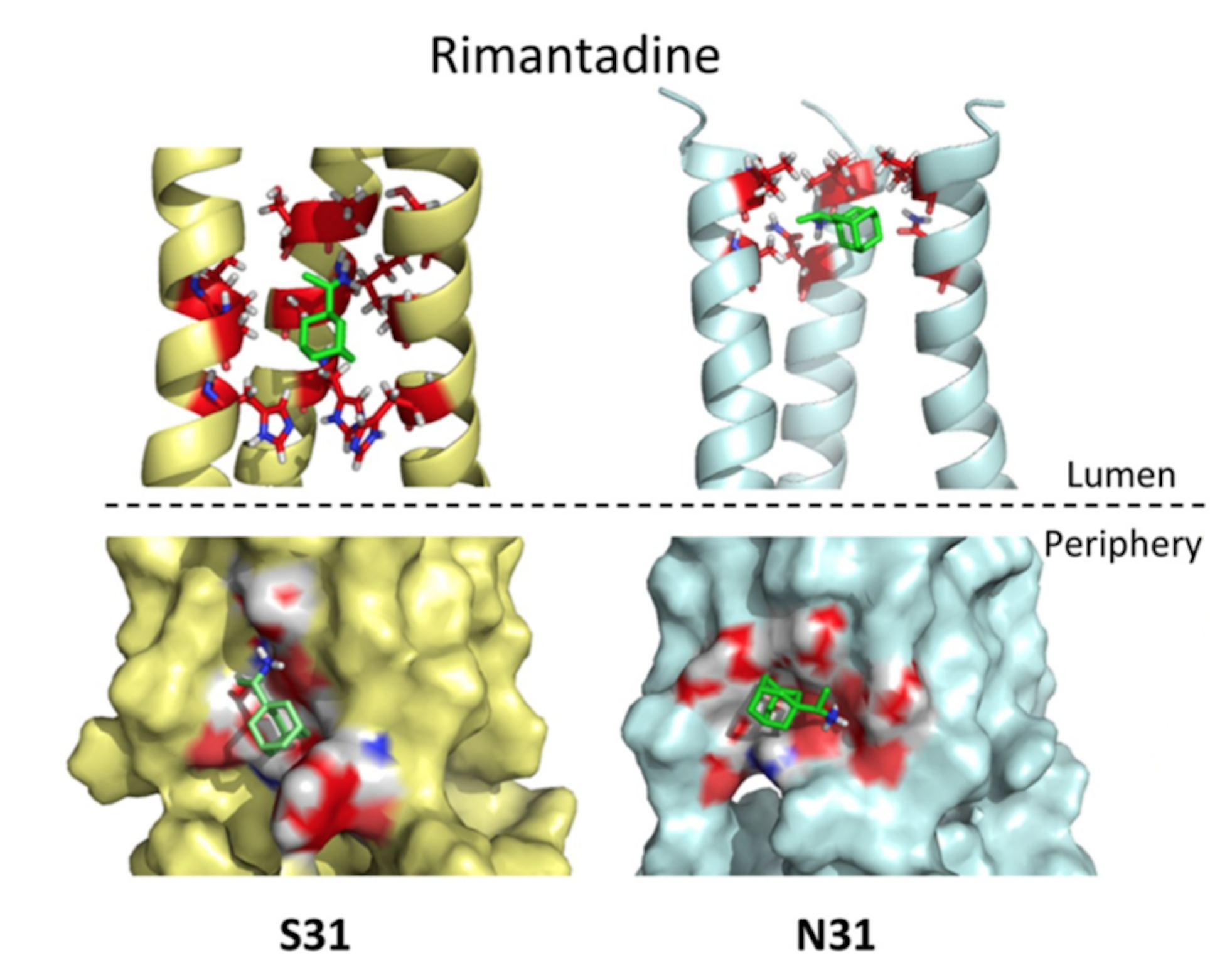
Rimantadine S31N Mutation Binding

==== Influenza resistance ====
Resistance to rimantadine can occur as a result of amino acid substitutions at certain locations in the transmembrane region of M2. This prevents binding of the antiviral to the channel.

The mutation S31N binding site with rimantadine is shown in the image to the left. It shows rimantadine binding into lumenal (top) or peripheral (bottom) binding sites with influenza M2 channel Serine 31 (gold) or Asparagine 31 (blue).

==== Rimantadine enantiomers interactions with M2 ====
Rimantadine, when sold as flumadine, is present as a racemic mixture; the R and S states are both present in the drug. Solid state NMR studies have shown that the R enantiomer has a stronger binding affinity to the M2 channel pore than the S-enantiomer of rimantadine. Antiviral assay and electrophysiology studies show that there is no significant difference between the R and S enantiomers in binding affinity to amino acids in the M2 channel. Since the enantiomers have similar binding affinity, they also have similar ability to block the channel pore and work as an effective antiviral.

Rimantadine enantiomers R and S are pictured interacting with the M2 pore below to the right. This image shows that there is not a significant modeled difference between the R and S enantiomers.

=== Parkinson's disease ===
Rimantadine, like its antiviral cousin amantadine, possesses antiparkinsonian activity and can be used in the treatment of Parkinson's disease. However, in general, neither rimantadine nor amantadine is a preferred agent for this therapy and would be reserved for cases of the disease that are less responsive to front-line treatments.

=== Others ===
Rimantadine is shown to be effective against other RNA-containing viruses. It can treat arboviruses like Saint Louis encephalitis and Sindbis. Other viruses that can be treated with Rimantadine include respiratory syncytial and parainfluenza viruses. Rimantadine has also been shown to treat chronic hepatitis C.

== Side effects ==
Rimantadine can produce gastrointestinal and central nervous system adverse effects. Approximately 6% of patients (compared to 4% of patients taking a placebo) reported side-effects at a dosage of 200 mg/d.

Common side effects include:

- Nausea
- Upset stomach
- Nervousness
- Tiredness
- Lightheadedness
- Trouble sleeping (insomnia)
- Difficulty concentrating
- Confusion

Rimantadine shows fewer CNS symptoms than its sister drug amantadine.

== Interactions ==
- Taking paracetamol (acetaminophen, Tylenol) or acetylsalicylic acid (aspirin) while taking rimantadine is known to reduce the body's uptake of rimantadine by approximately 12%.
- Cimetidine also affects the body's uptake of rimantadine.
- Taking anticholinergic drugs with amantadine may increase underlying seizure disorders and aggravate congestive heart failure.

== Pharmacology ==
=== Pharmacodynamics ===
The related drugs memantine and to a much lesser extent amantadine are known to act as NMDA receptor antagonists. The affinity of rimantadine for the NMDA receptor does not seem to have been reported. Analogues of rimantadine are known to act as NMDA receptor antagonists.

== History ==
Rimantadine was discovered in 1963 and patented in 1965 in the US by William W. Prichard in Du Pont & Co., Wilmington, Delaware (patent on new chemical compound U.S. patent 3,352,912, 1965 and on the first method of synthesis U.S. patent 3,592,934, 1967). Prichard's methods of synthesis of rimantadine from the corresponding ketone oxime were based on its reduction with lithium aluminum hydride.

== See also ==
- Adapromine
- Bromantane
- Memantine
- Tromantadine
