= Idramantone =

Immunostimulant

Clinical data
- Other names: Kemantane; Kemantan; 5-Hydroxyadamantanone; 4-Oxo-1-adamantanol; 4-Oxoadamantan-1-ol; 1-Hydroxy-4-ketoadamantane

Identifiers
- IUPAC name: 5-hydroxyadamantan-2-one
- CAS Number: 20098-14-0
- PubChem CID: 64184
- ChemSpider: 57758
- UNII: 7J4759Y5J1
- ChEBI: CHEBI:48581
- ChEMBL: ChEMBL2105062
- CompTox Dashboard (EPA): DTXSID8046581

Chemical and physical data
- Formula: C_{10}H_{14}O_{2}
- Molar mass: 166.220 g·mol^{−1}
- 3D model (JSmol): Interactive image
- SMILES: C1C2CC3CC(C2)(CC1C3=O)O
- InChI: InChI=1S/C10H14O2/c11-9-7-1-6-2-8(9)5-10(12,3-6)4-7/h6-8,12H,1-5H2; Key:TZBDEVBNMSLVKT-UHFFFAOYSA-N

Idramantone, also known as kemantane or as 5-hydroxyadamantan-2-one, is an experimental immunostimulant of the adamantane group that was never marketed. It is described as a lymphocyte and antibody stimulant in mice and as a T-cell suppressor. The drug was first described by 1968.
