= Cerebral vasodilator =

Drug that increases brain blood flow

- Drug class

Class identifiers
- Use: To treat cerebrovascular insufficiency
- Mode of action: Increase blood flow to the brain

Legal status

A cerebral vasodilator is a drug which acts as a vasodilator in the brain. They are used to improve blood flow in people with cerebrovascular insufficiency and to treat neurological disorders secondary to this condition. A number of different cerebral vasodilators exist. An example is ifenprodil, which has been marketed for use as a cerebral vasodilator in France, Hong Kong, and Japan. Other examples include buphenine (nylidrin), isoxsuprine, oxyfedrine, suloctidil, and tinofedrine.

Similar drugs include cerebral activators, or cerebral metabolism activators, like bifemelane, indeloxazine, and teniloxazine, which are also used to treat cerebrovascular disease.

== See also ==
- Nootropic
