= Tinofedrine =

Cerebral vasodilator

Clinical data
- Other names: Novocebrin; D-8955; D8955; N-(3,3-Di-3-thienyl)-2-propenyl)norephedrine; (1R,2S)-β-Hydroxy-N-(3,3-di-3-thienyl)-2-propenyl)amphetamine
- Drug class: Sympathomimetic; Cerebral vasodilator

Identifiers
- IUPAC name: (1R,2S)-2-[3,3-di(thiophen-3-yl)prop-2-enylamino]-1-phenylpropan-1-ol
- CAS Number: 66788-41-8 50776-39-1 (hydrochloride)
- PubChem CID: 3033341
- ChemSpider: 2298059
- UNII: OVJ0W8F17T
- ChEBI: CHEBI:135502
- ChEMBL: ChEMBL3989760
- CompTox Dashboard (EPA): DTXSID00216907
- ECHA InfoCard: 100.060.415

Chemical and physical data
- Formula: C_{20}H_{21}NOS_{2}
- Molar mass: 355.51 g·mol^{−1}
- 3D model (JSmol): Interactive image
- SMILES: C[C@@H]([C@@H](C1=CC=CC=C1)O)NCC=C(C2=CSC=C2)C3=CSC=C3
- InChI: InChI=1S/C20H21NOS2/c1-15(20(22)16-5-3-2-4-6-16)21-10-7-19(17-8-11-23-13-17)18-9-12-24-14-18/h2-9,11-15,20-22H,10H2,1H3/t15-,20-/m0/s1; Key:JQSHEDRVRBSFCZ-YWZLYKJASA-N

Tinofedrine (INN; developmental code name D-8955, proposed brand name Novocebrin), also known as N-(3,3-di-3-thienyl)-2-propenyl)norephedrine, is a sympathomimetic and cerebral vasodilator of the amphetamine family which was never marketed. It is a derivative of norephedrine and an analogue of related agents like oxyfedrine, buphenine (nylidrin), and isoxsuprine. The drug was first described in the literature by 1978.
