= Oxilofrine =

Sympathomimetic agent

Clinical data
- Trade names: Carnigen, Cophylac, Suprifen, others
- Other names: Oxilophrine; Hydroxyephedrine; (±)-Hydroxyephedrine; 4-Hydroxyephedrine; p-Hydroxyephedrine; Oxyephedrine; Methylsynephrine; 4-HMP; 4,β-Dihydroxy-N-methyl-α-methylphenethylamine; 4,β-Dihydroxy-N-methylamphetamine
- Routes of administration: Oral
- Drug class: Antihypotensive agent; Cough suppressant; Norepinephrine releasing agent; Alpha-adrenergic receptor agonist
- ATC code: None

Legal status
- Legal status: BR: Class A3 (Psychoactive drugs); US: Unapproved "New Drug" (as defined by 21 U.S. Code § 321(p)(1)). Use in dietary supplements, food, or medicine is unlawful; otherwise uncontrolled.

Identifiers
- IUPAC name: (1S*,2R*)-(±)-4-(1-Hydroxy-2-methylamino-propyl)phenol
- CAS Number: 365-26-4
- PubChem CID: 9701
- DrugBank: DB11610
- ChemSpider: 9320
- UNII: F49638UBDR
- KEGG: D08314
- ChEMBL: ChEMBL30400
- CompTox Dashboard (EPA): DTXSID30110025
- ECHA InfoCard: 100.006.067

Chemical and physical data
- Formula: C_{10}H_{15}NO_{2}
- Molar mass: 181.235 g·mol^{−1}
- 3D model (JSmol): Interactive image
- SMILES: OC1=CC=C(C(O)C(C)NC)C=C1
- InChI: InChI=1S/C10H15NO2/c1-7(11-2)10(13)8-3-5-9(12)6-4-8/h3-7,10-13H,1-2H3; Key:OXFGTKPPFSCSMA-UHFFFAOYSA-N

Oxilofrine, sold under the brand names Carnigen and Suprifen among others, is a sympathomimetic medication which has been used as an antihypotensive agent and cough suppressant. It is taken by mouth.

Oxilofrine acts as a norepinephrine releasing agent and hence is an indirectly acting sympathomimetic. It is a substituted amphetamine and is closely related to ephedrine (with oxilofrine also being known as 4-hydroxyephedrine).

Oxilofrine was first developed in the 1930s. It is mostly no longer marketed today.

== Pharmacology ==
=== Pharmacodynamics ===
Oxilofrine is described as an ephedrine-like indirectly acting sympathomimetic and antihypotensive agent. It acts as a norepinephrine releasing agent and indirectly activates the α- and β-adrenergic receptors. The drug has positive inotropic effects (increases myocardial contractility).

As an α-adrenergic receptor agonist, Oxilofrine activates the Alpha-1 adrenergic receptor. Activation of said receptor causes vasoconstriction, which is likely how it treats cough. By that mechanism, secretion of mucus into the airway would be dampened, thus reducing the urge to cough. It's also postulated that Oxilofrine acts as a sigma-1 receptor agonist, since it shares structural similarities to dextromethorphan and methamphetamine, two other sigma-1 receptor agonists.

== Chemistry ==
Oxilofrine, also known as 4,β-dihydroxy-N-methyl-α-methylphenethylamine or as 4,β-dihydroxy-N-methylamphetamine, is a substituted phenethylamine and amphetamine derivative. It is the racemic 4-hydroxylated analogue of ephedrine ((1R,2S)-β-hydroxy-N-methylamphetamine). It is also related to pholedrine (4-hydroxy-N-methylamphetamine).

The predicted log P of oxilofrine ranges from -0.13 to 0.6. It is more hydrophilic than ephedrine, which has an experimental log P of 1.13 and a predicted log P of 0.9 to 1.32.

== History ==
Oxilofrine was originally developed in the 1930s as a cardiac stimulant. Trade names included Suprifen (Bayer) and, combined with an adenosine-containing standardized organ extract, Carnigen (Hoechst AG).

In combination with normethadone, it was marketed as a cough suppressant under the trade name Ticarda. As of 2021, this formulation was still manufactured in Canada by Valeant and sold as Cophylac.

Several other sympathomimetics and vasodilators were developed as chemical derivatives of oxilofrine, such as the β_{2}-adrenergic receptor agonists buphenine and isoxsuprine.

== Society and culture ==
=== Names ===
Oxilofrine is the generic name of the drug and its INN. It is also known by synonyms including methylsynephrine, oxyphedrine, and hydroxyephedrine. Brand names of oxilofrine include Carnigen, Cophylac (with normethadone), Suprifen, and Ticarda (also with normethadone), among others.

=== Availability ===
Oxilofrine has been marketed in Austria, Canada, and Germany.

=== Use in exercise and sports ===
Oxilofrine is currently a World Anti-Doping Agency (WADA) prohibited substance when used in competition. It has been found as an adulterant in some dietary supplements. Even after receiving warning letters from the FDA, some sports and weight loss supplement companies continue to use oxilofrine as an undeclared ingredient in their products despite it being prohibited.

==== List of doping cases ====
Several doping cases involving oxilofrine have been publicized, including:

- In 2009, Brazilian/American cyclist Flávia Oliveira was suspended for 2 years after taking a supplement known as "HyperDrive 3.0+" which contained methylsynephrine, a chemical equivalent of oxilofrine, among other substances. Her sentence was eventually reduced to 18 months after an appeal as there was enough evidence that she had unknowingly consumed said substance as the old label did not list methylsynephrine.
- On 18 September 2010, Vietnamese weightlifter Hoàng Anh Tuấn, silver medalist in 2008 Summer Olympics was handed a four-year ban, later reduced to two years, for testing positive with the substance. It was found out that the substance came from unlabeled drinks he consumed during his training in China.
- On July 14, 2013, Jamaican runners Asafa Powell and Sherone Simpson tested positive for oxilofrine prior to the 2013 World Athletics Championships. Powell, however, maintained that he did not take any banned supplements knowingly or willfully. Powell voluntarily withdrew as a result of the test. On 10 April 2014, both athletes received an 18-month suspension from competing, which was set to expire in December that year. However, after appealing to the Court of Arbitration for Sport (CAS), both athletes' suspensions were lifted on 14 July 2014.
- On July 16, 2015, Red Sox pitching prospect Michael Kopech was suspended without pay for 50 games after testing positive for oxilofrine, which is a banned substance under the Minor League Drug Prevention and Treatment Program. Kopech denied knowingly taking the substance.
- In October 2018, the WBO stripped boxer Billy Joe Saunders of its middleweight world title after he tested positive for oxilofrine, as a result of a drug test administered by the Voluntary Anti-Doping Association (VADA). In his defense, Saunders held that while the substance was proscribed by VADA it was not banned "out of competition" by UK Anti-Doping, or the British Boxing Board of Control, but this appeal was rejected.

== Other drugs ==
Oxilofrine is a known metabolite of para-methoxymethamphetamine (PMMA).
