= Sofinicline =

Clinical data
- Other names: ABT-894; ABT894; A-422894.0
- Routes of administration: Oral
- Drug class: α_{4}β_{2} nicotinic acetylcholine receptor agonist
- ATC code: None

Pharmacokinetic data
- Onset of action: 2–4 hours (T_{max})
- Elimination half-life: 4–6 hours

Identifiers
- IUPAC name: (1S,5S)-3-(5,6-dichloro-3-pyridinyl)-3,6-diazabicyclo[3.2.0]heptane
- CAS Number: 799279-80-4
- PubChem CID: 10131048
- DrugBank: DB12527
- ChemSpider: 8306563
- UNII: SQC232V4YY
- KEGG: D09382
- ChEMBL: ChEMBL238465

Chemical and physical data
- Formula: C_{10}H_{11}Cl_{2}N_{3}
- Molar mass: 244.12 g·mol^{−1}
- 3D model (JSmol): Interactive image
- SMILES: C1[C@H]2CN(C[C@H]2N1)C3=CC(=C(N=C3)Cl)Cl
- InChI: InChI=1S/C10H11Cl2N3/c11-8-1-7(3-14-10(8)12)15-4-6-2-13-9(6)5-15/h1,3,6,9,13H,2,4-5H2/t6-,9+/m0/s1; Key:MBQYQLWSBRANKQ-IMTBSYHQSA-N

Sofinicline (INN, USAN; developmental code names ABT-894 and A-422894.0) is a nicotinic acetylcholine receptor (nAChR) agonist which was under development for the treatment of attention deficit hyperactivity disorder (ADHD), cognition disorders, and diabetic neuropathies but was never marketed. It is taken orally.

The drug acts as a highly selective full agonist of the α_{4}β_{2} nicotinic acetylcholine receptor. It has been found to enhance cognition and memory in rodents. Sofinicline's affinity for the receptor is approximately 0.1 nM. The time to peak levels of sofinicline is 2 to 4 hours and its elimination half-life is 4 to 6 hours. Other pharmacokinetic data for sofinicline have also been reported. Side effects of sofinicline in humans include increased heart rate, nausea, dizziness, headache, and fatigue.

Sofinicline was under development by Abbott Laboratories and NeuroSearch. It reached phase 2 clinical trials for ADHD and neuropathic pain and the preclinical research stage of development for cognition disorders prior to the discontinuation of its development.

== See also ==
- List of investigational attention deficit hyperactivity disorder drugs
- List of investigational analgesics
