= Ciforadenant =

Clinical data
- Other names: CPI-444; CPI444; V-81444; V81444; BIIB34
- Routes of administration: Oral
- Drug class: Adenosine A_{2A} receptor antagonist
- ATC code: None

Pharmacokinetic data
- Elimination half-life: Single: 3 hours Multiple: 10.2–10.6 hours

Identifiers
- IUPAC name: 7-(5-methylfuran-2-yl)-3-[[6-[[(3S)-oxolan-3-yl]oxymethyl]-2-pyridinyl]methyl]triazolo[4,5-d]pyrimidin-5-amine
- CAS Number: 1202402-40-1
- PubChem CID: 44537963
- IUPHAR/BPS: 10190
- DrugBank: DB16125
- ChemSpider: 67896526
- UNII: 8KFO2187CP
- KEGG: D11547
- ChEMBL: ChEMBL4297184

Chemical and physical data
- Formula: C_{20}H_{21}N_{7}O_{3}
- Molar mass: 407.434 g·mol^{−1}
- 3D model (JSmol): Interactive image
- SMILES: CC1=CC=C(O1)C2=C3C(=NC(=N2)N)N(N=N3)CC4=NC(=CC=C4)CO[C@H]5CCOC5
- InChI: InChI=1S/C20H21N7O3/c1-12-5-6-16(30-12)17-18-19(24-20(21)23-17)27(26-25-18)9-13-3-2-4-14(22-13)10-29-15-7-8-28-11-15/h2-6,15H,7-11H2,1H3,(H2,21,23,24)/t15-/m0/s1; Key:KURQKNMKCGYWRJ-HNNXBMFYSA-N

Ciforadenant (INN, USAN; developmental code names CPI-444 and V-81444) is an adenosine A_{2A} receptor antagonist which is under development for the treatment of renal cell carcinoma and non-small cell lung cancer. It is or was also under development for the treatment of attention-deficit hyperactivity disorder (ADHD), cancer, multiple myeloma, Parkinson's disease, and solid tumors, but no recent development has been reported for these indications. The drug is taken orally.

It shows high affinity for the adenosine A_{2A} receptor (K_{i} = 3.54 nM) and high selectivity for this receptor over the other adenosine receptors (54- to 693-fold). The elimination half-life of ciforadenant is 3 hours with a single dose and 10.2 to 10.6 hours with multiple repeated doses in humans.

Ciforadenant was originated by Vernalis and is under development by Corvus Pharmaceuticals. As of January 2026, it is in phase 2 clinical trials for renal cell carcinoma and phase 1/2 trials for non-small cell lung cancer, whereas there has been no recent development for other uses.

== See also ==
- List of investigational attention deficit hyperactivity disorder drugs
- List of investigational Parkinson's disease drugs
