= Fasoracetam =

Chemical compound

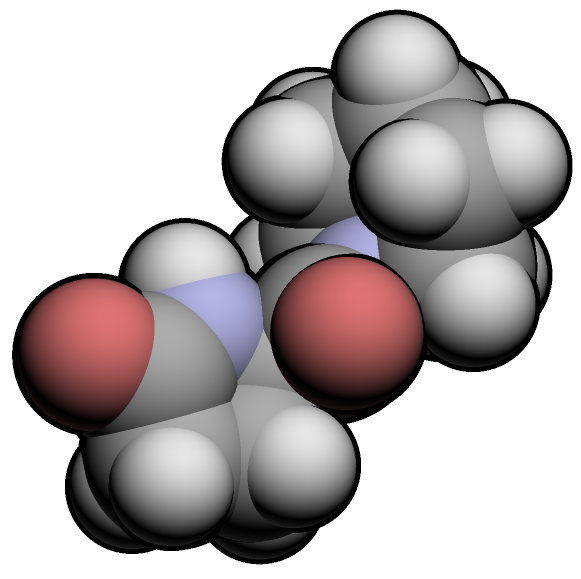

Clinical data
- Other names: AEVI-001; AEVI-004; LAM-105; MDGN-001; NB-001; NFC-1; NS-105; (5R)-5-Oxo-D-prolinepiperidinamide
- Routes of administration: Oral
- Drug class: Racetam

Legal status
- Legal status: AU: S4 (Prescription only); US: Not FDA-approved

Pharmacokinetic data
- Bioavailability: 79–97% (animals)
- Elimination half-life: 4–6.5 hours

Identifiers
- IUPAC name: (5R)-5-(piperidine-1-carbonyl)pyrrolidin-2-one
- CAS Number: 110958-19-5
- PubChem CID: 198695
- DrugBank: DB16163
- ChemSpider: 171980
- UNII: 42O8UF5CJB
- KEGG: C13311
- ChEBI: CHEBI:31592
- ChEMBL: ChEMBL2106179
- CompTox Dashboard (EPA): DTXSID9048855

Chemical and physical data
- Formula: C_{10}H_{16}N_{2}O_{2}
- Molar mass: 196.250 g·mol^{−1}
- 3D model (JSmol): Interactive image
- SMILES: C1CCN(CC1)C(=O)[C@H]2CCC(=O)N2
- InChI: InChI=1S/C10H16N2O2/c13-9-5-4-8(11-9)10(14)12-6-2-1-3-7-12/h8H,1-7H2,(H,11,13)/t8-/m1/s1; Key:GOWRRBABHQUJMX-MRVPVSSYSA-N

Fasoracetam (INN) is an experimental drug of the racetam group which was never marketed. It is a putative nootropic that failed to show sufficient efficacy in clinical trials for vascular dementia. The drug was also subsequently repurposed for treatment of a variety of other conditions, such as attention deficit hyperactivity disorder (ADHD), but effectiveness for ADHD was disappointing and development of fasoracetam for most other conditions has been discontinued as well. In any case, it remains under development for treatment of DiGeorge syndrome. In addition to its clinical development, fasoracetam is sold online and used non-medically as a nootropic.

== Pharmacology ==
Fasoracetam appears to modulate and stimulate all three groups of metabotropic glutamate receptors (mGluRs). It has been found to improve certain aspects of cognitive function in rodent studies. The drug is orally bioavailable and is excreted mostly unchanged in urine.

== Chemistry ==
Fasoracetam is a racetam and a derivative of pyroglutamic acid.

== History ==
Fasoracetam was developed in the late 1980s. It was discovered by scientists at the Japanese pharmaceutical company Nippon Shinyaku, which brought it through Phase 3 clinical trials for vascular dementia, and abandoned it due to lack of efficacy. Subsequently, fasoracetam was repurposed for treatment of ADHD and other indications.

Scientists at Children's Hospital of Philadelphia led by Hakon Hakonarson have studied fasoracetam's potential use in attention deficit hyperactivity disorder. Hakonarson's company neuroFix tried to bring the drug to market for this use; neuroFix acquired Nippon Shinyaku's clinical data as part of its efforts. neuroFix was acquired by Medgenics in 2015. Medgenics changed its name to Aevi Genomic Medicine in 2016.

Clinical trials in adolescents with ADHD who also have mGluR mutations started in 2016. While fasoracetam may be effective in the treatment of ADHD in people with specific mGluR mutations, these represent around 10% of total ADHD cases, and fasoracetam is likely ineffective in all other cases. Studies showing improvements in cognitive function from fasoracetam have exclusively been done on rodents.

== Society and culture ==
=== Legality ===
==== Australia ====
Fasoracetam is a schedule 4 substance in Australia under the Poisons Standard (February 2020). A schedule 4 substance is classified as "Prescription Only Medicine, or Prescription Animal Remedy – Substances, the use or supply of which should be by or on the order of persons permitted by State or Territory legislation to prescribe and should be available from a pharmacist on prescription."

== Research ==
Fasoracetam was originally developed for treatment of cognitive impairment related to dementia. It reached phase 3 clinical trials for this indication. However, development was discontinued due to lack of effectiveness and fasoracetam was never marketed.

Fasoracetam (developmental code names AFEVI-001, LAM-105, MDGN-001, NFC-1, NS-105) was under development by Avalo Therapeutics (previously Cerecor) for the treatment of attention deficit hyperactivity disorder (ADHD), autistic disorder, cognition disorders, DiGeorge syndrome, and major depressive disorder. However, development for all indications was discontinued by 2018. The drug (developmental code name NB-001) is also under development by Nobias Therapeutics for the treatment of DiGeorge syndrome and is in phase 2 clinical trials for this use as of October 2023. A co-crystallized form of fasoracetam (developmental code name AEVI-004) is under development by Avalo Therapeutics for the treatment of ADHD, autistic disorder, and epilepsy as well. However, no recent development has been reported for these indications as of April 2023.

The results of clinical studies for ADHD with fasoracetam have not shown statistical significance in efficacy.

== See also ==
- List of investigational ADHD drugs
- List of investigational cognition and memory disorder drugs
