= Cerebral activator =

- Drug class

Class identifiers
- Synonyms: Cerebral metabolic enhancer; Cerebral metabolic activator; Cerebral metabolism activator; Cerebral metabolism enhancer
- Use: To treat cerebrovascular diseases
- Mode of action: Increase activation of the brain

Legal status

A cerebral activator, also known as a cerebral metabolic enhancer or activator, is a type of drug that "activates" the central nervous system in the context of cerebrovascular diseases such as stroke and dementia. The term has been used specifically to describe a few Japanese drugs, such as indeloxazine and bifemelane.

== See also ==
- Cerebral vasodilator
- Nootropic
