= NNI-351 =

Chemical compound

Clinical data
- Routes of administration: By mouth

Identifiers
- IUPAC name: 4-(3-Cyano-6-ethoxyquinolin-2-yl)-N-(2-fluorophenyl)-1,4-diazepane-1-carbothioamide
- CAS Number: 929607-23-8
- PubChem CID: 16661882
- ChemSpider: 17594951
- UNII: 97LG4X5P2E

Chemical and physical data
- Formula: C_{24}H_{24}FN_{5}OS
- Molar mass: 449.55 g·mol^{−1}
- 3D model (JSmol): Interactive image
- SMILES: CCOC1=CC2=C(C=C1)N=C(C(=C2)C#N)N3CCCN(CC3)C(=S)NC4=CC=CC=C4F
- InChI: InChI=1S/C24H24FN5OS/c1-2-31-19-8-9-21-17(15-19)14-18(16-26)23(27-21)29-10-5-11-30(13-12-29)24(32)28-22-7-4-3-6-20(22)25/h3-4,6-9,14-15H,2,5,10-13H2,1H3,(H,28,32); Key:RQXUPDSAFGWKMO-UHFFFAOYSA-N

NNI-351 is an orally active inhibitor of DYRK1A and neurogenesis enhancer which is under development by NeuroNascent, Inc. for the treatment of Down syndrome, depression, and post-traumatic stress disorder (PTSD). As of 2017, it is in the preclinical development stage, and has yet to progress to human clinical trials. In July 2022, NNI-351 was granted orphan drug status by the FDA for the treatment of Fragile X syndrome.

== See also ==
- List of investigational antidepressants
