= Serdexmethylphenidate =

CNS stimulant prodrug

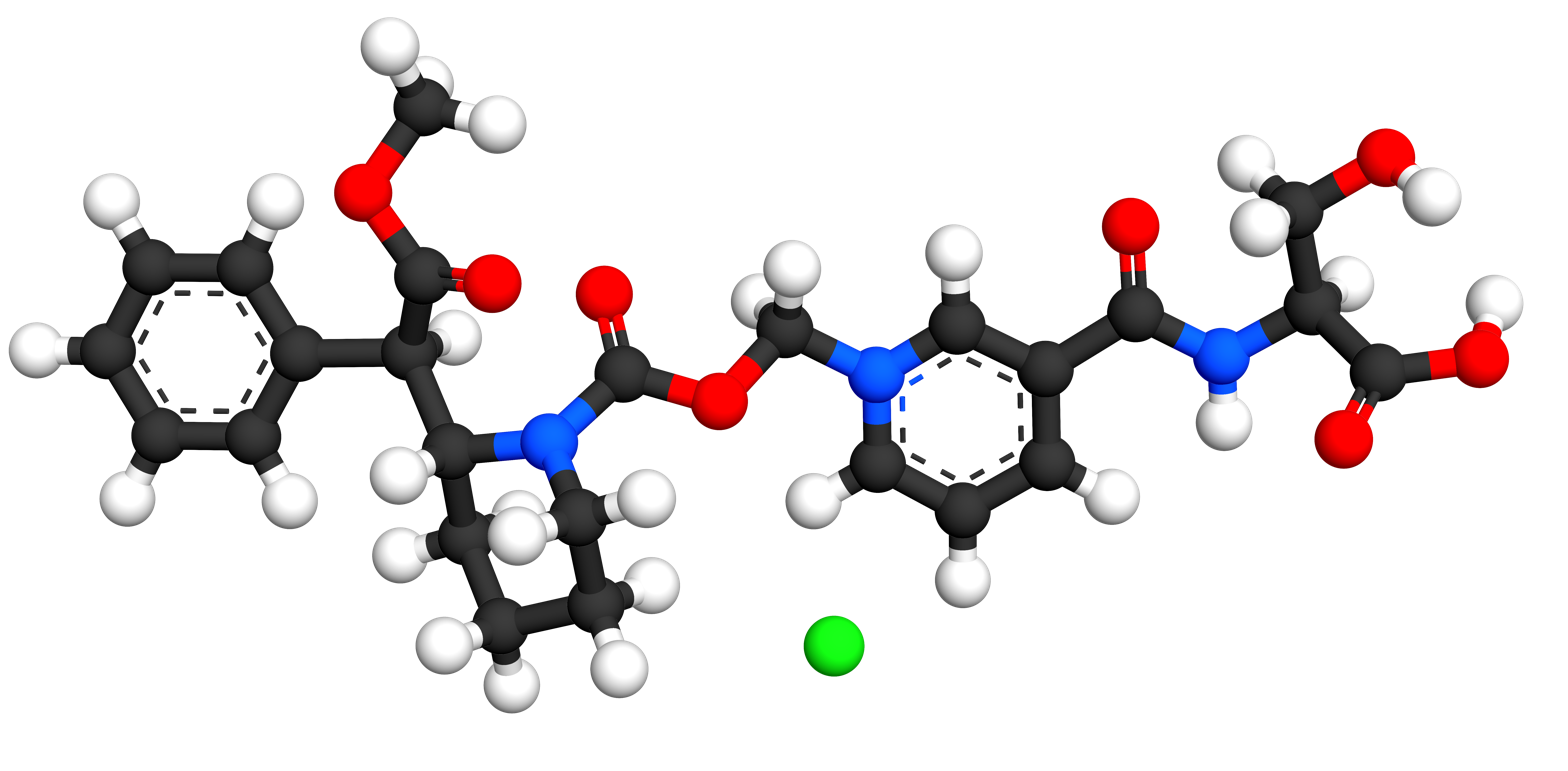

Clinical data
- Other names: SDX
- License data: US DailyMed: Serdexmethylphenidate
- Routes of administration: By mouth
- ATC code: None

Legal status
- Legal status: US: Schedule IV

Pharmacokinetic data
- Bioavailability: < 3% (absolute oral)
- Metabolites: Dexmethylphenidate, ritalinic acid
- Elimination half-life: 5.7 hours

Identifiers
- CAS Number: 1996626-29-9; 1996626-30-2
- PubChem CID: 134823895; 134823897
- DrugBank: DB16629; DBSALT003162
- ChemSpider: 81367537; 81368035
- UNII: 0H8KZ470DW; FN54BT298Y
- KEGG: D11401
- ChEMBL: ChEMBL4298139

Chemical and physical data
- Formula: C_{25}H_{29}N_{3}O_{8}
- Molar mass: 499.520 g·mol^{−1}
- 3D model (JSmol): Interactive image; Interactive image
- SMILES: COC(=O)C(C1CCCCN1C(=O)OC[N+]2=CC=CC(=C2)C(=O)NC(CO)C(=O)[O-])C3=CC=CC=C3; COC(=O)[C@@H]([C@H]1CCCCN1C(=O)OC[N+]2=CC=CC(=C2)C(=O)N[C@@H](CO)C(=O)O)C3=CC=CC=C3.[Cl-]
- InChI: InChI=1S/C25H29N3O8/c1-35-24(33)21(17-8-3-2-4-9-17)20-11-5-6-13-28(20)25(34)36-16-27-12-7-10-18(14-27)22(30)26-19(15-29)23(31)32/h2-4,7-10,12,14,19-21,29H,5-6,11,13,15-16H2,1H3,(H-,26,30,31,32)/t19-,20+,21+/m0/s1; Key:UBZPNQRBUOBBLN-PWRODBHTSA-N; InChI=1S/C25H29N3O8.ClH/c1-35-24(33)21(17-8-3-2-4-9-17)20-11-5-6-13-28(20)25(34)36-16-27-12-7-10-18(14-27)22(30)26-19(15-29)23(31)32;/h2-4,7-10,12,14,19-21,29H,5-6,11,13,15-16H2,1H3,(H-,26,30,31,32);1H/t19-,20+,21+;/m0./s1; Key:GONQEUJYYMYNMN-HWAJWLCKSA-N

Serdexmethylphenidate (SDX) is a prodrug of dexmethylphenidate created by the pharmaceutical company Zevra Therapeutics. The compound was first approved by the FDA as one of the active ingredients in Azstarys for the treatment of attention deficit hyperactivity disorder (ADHD) in children, adolescents, and adults in March 2021. Serdexmethylphenidate is a prodrug which has a delayed onset of action and a prolonged duration of effects compared to dexmethylphenidate, its parent compound.

== Medical uses ==
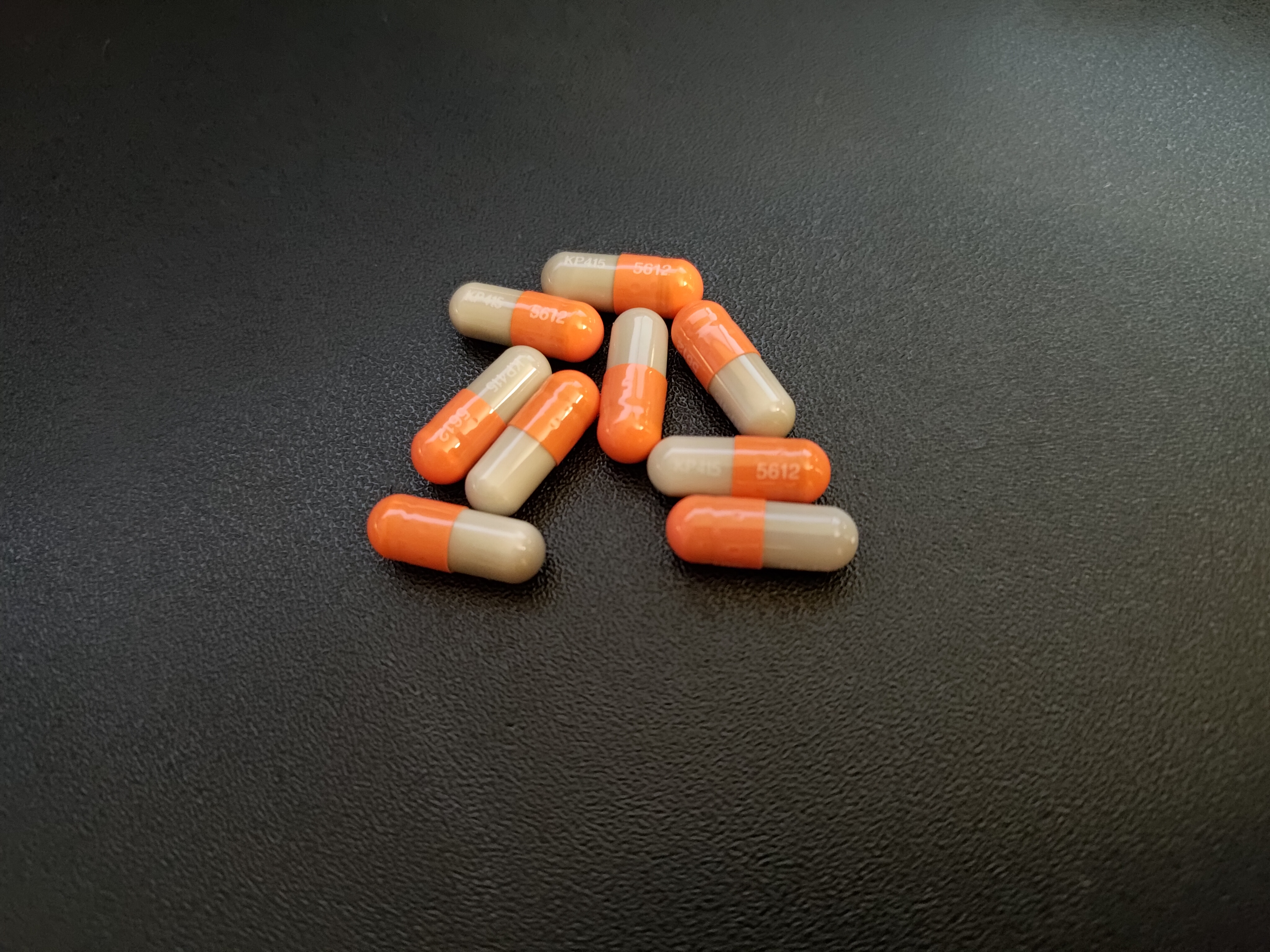
Azstarys capsules containing 52.3mg serdexmethylphenidate chloride, 10.4mg dexmethylphenidate chloride

The combination serdexmethylphenidate/dexmethylphenidate (Azstarys) was approved by the US Food and Drug Administration (FDA) in March 2021, for the treatment of ADHD in people six years of age and older. Co-formulation of serdexmethylphenidate with dexmethylphenidate allows for a more rapid onset of action while still retaining up to 13 hours of therapeutic efficacy.

== Pharmacology ==
Serdexmethylphenidate has mean terminal plasma elimination half-life of 5.7 hours. Less than 3% of the drug is measurable in circulation intact following oral administration. When administered alone, serdexmethylphenidate produces a dexmethylphenidate t_{max} of 8 hours. It is believed that serdexmethylphenidate is metabolized to dexmethylphenidate primarily in the lower gastrointestinal tract. Enzymes involved in this conversion have yet to be elucidated.

== Society and culture ==
=== Abuse potential ===
The abuse potential of serdexmethylphenidate has been evaluated in clinical studies. Administration of serdexmethylphenidate via common routes of administration used during the abuse of psychostimulants such as insufflation and intravenous injection resulted in significantly reduced systemic exposure to active dexmethylphenidate and thus markedly decreased pharmacodynamic effects when compared to unmodified dexmethylphenidate.

Following an Eight Factor Analysis by the FDA Controlled Substance Staff (CSS), the U.S. Department of Health and Human Services (HHS) provided a scheduling recommendation to the Drug Enforcement Administration (DEA) to control serdexmethylphenidate and its salts in Schedule IV of the Controlled Substances Act (CSA). Based on this recommendation and its own review, the DEA concluded that serdexmethylphenidate met the criteria for placement in schedule IV of the CSA.

== Research ==
Due to the delayed onset and prolonged duration of effects following oral administration of serdexmethylphenidate, several dosage forms containing serdexmethylphenidate are under investigation for use as long-acting psychostimulant in the treatment of various CNS disorders, substance use disorder (SUD), and sleep disorders. Under the developmental codename KP484, serdexmethylphenidate is being investigated as part of a potential "super-extended duration" psychostimulant, with therapeutic efficacy lasting up to 16 hours following oral administration.

In January 2021, the FDA granted approval for clinical trials investigating serdexmethylphenidate (as KP879) for the treatment for stimulant use disorder.
