= Viloxazine =

Medication used to treat ADHD and depression

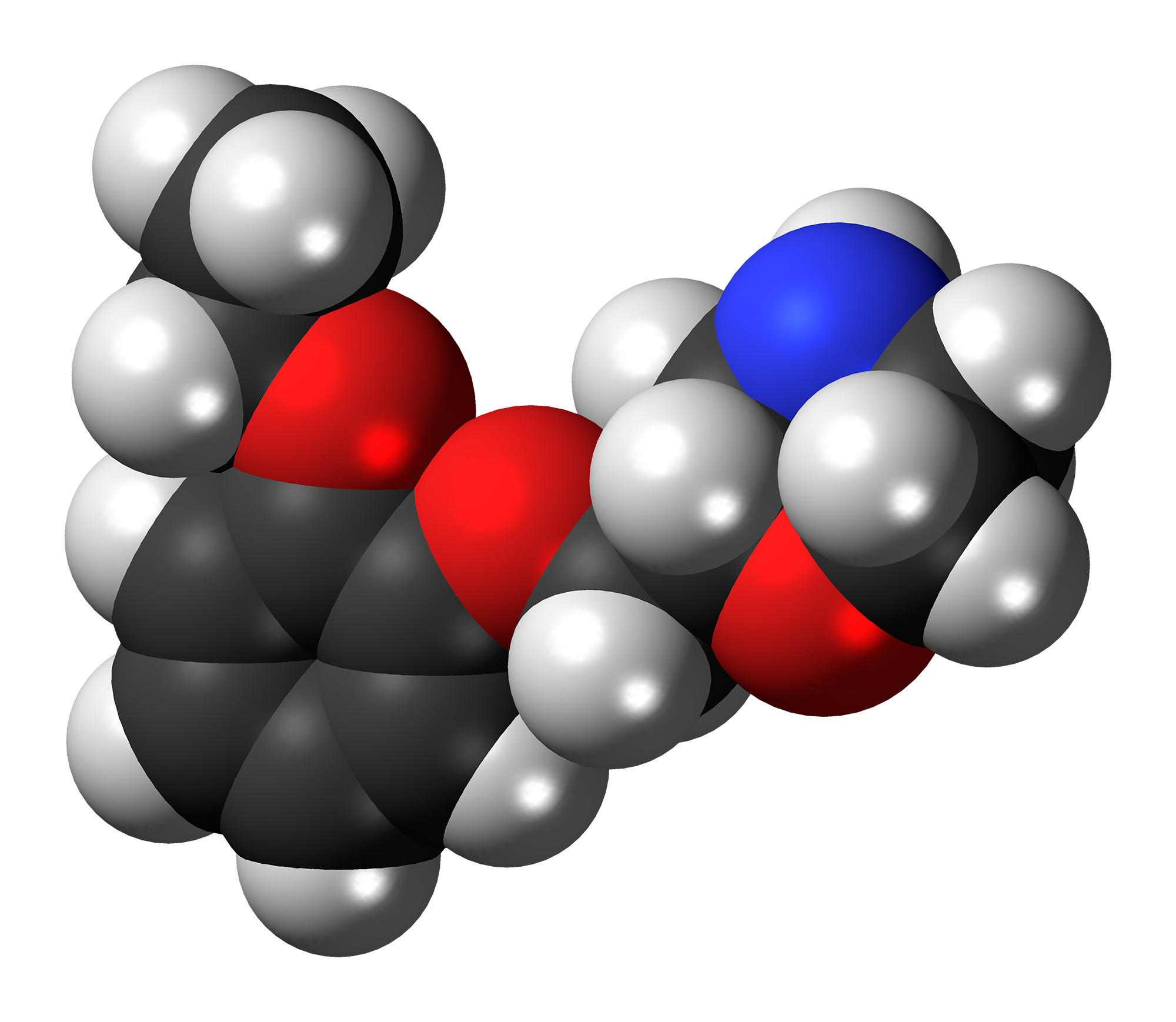

Clinical data
- Trade names: Qelbree, others
- Other names: ICI-58834; SPN-812; SPN-809
- License data: US DailyMed: Viloxazine
- Routes of administration: By mouth
- Drug class: Norepinephrine reuptake inhibitor
- ATC code: N06AX09 (WHO)

Legal status
- Legal status: US: ℞-only

Pharmacokinetic data
- Protein binding: 76–82%
- Metabolism: Hydroxylation (CYP2D6), glucuronidation (UGT1A9, UGT2B15)
- Metabolites: 5-Hydroxyviloxazine glucuronide
- Elimination half-life: IR: 2–5 hours ER: 7.02 ± 4.74 hours
- Excretion: Urine (~90%), feces (<1%)

Identifiers
- IUPAC name: (RS)-2-[(2-ethoxyphenoxy)methyl]morpholine
- CAS Number: 46817-91-8; HCl: 35604-67-2
- PubChem CID: 5666
- DrugBank: DB09185; HCl: DBSALT001262
- ChemSpider: 5464; HCl: 64514
- UNII: 5I5Y2789ZF; HCl: OQW30I1332
- KEGG: D08673; HCl: D02572
- ChEBI: CHEBI:94405
- ChEMBL: ChEMBL306700; HCl: ChEMBL2106483
- CompTox Dashboard (EPA): DTXSID6057900
- ECHA InfoCard: 100.051.148

Chemical and physical data
- Formula: C_{13}H_{19}NO_{3}
- Molar mass: 237.299 g·mol^{−1}
- 3D model (JSmol): Interactive image; HCl: Interactive image
- Chirality: Racemic mixture 0F
- SMILES: CCOC1=CC=CC=C1OCC1CNCCO1; HCl: Cl.CCOC1=CC=CC=C1OCC1CNCCO1
- InChI: InChI=1S/C13H19NO3/c1-2-15-12-5-3-4-6-13(12)17-10-11-9-14-7-8-16-11/h3-6,11,14H,2,7-10H2,1H3; Key:YWPHCCPCQOJSGZ-UHFFFAOYSA-N; HCl: InChI=1S/C13H19NO3.ClH/c1-2-15-12-5-3-4-6-13(12)17-10-11-9-14-7-8-16-11;/h3-6,11,14H,2,7-10H2,1H3;1H; Key:HJOCKFVCMLCPTP-UHFFFAOYSA-N

Viloxazine, sold under the brand name Qelbree among others, is a selective norepinephrine reuptake inhibitor medication that is used to treat attention deficit hyperactivity disorder (ADHD) in children and adults. It was marketed for almost 30 years as an antidepressant before being discontinued and subsequently repurposed as a treatment for ADHD. It is taken orally. It was used as an antidepressant in an immediate-release form and is used in ADHD in an extended-release form, although evidence indicates it less effective than stimulant medications like methylphenidate.

Side effects include insomnia, headache, somnolence, fatigue, nausea, vomiting, decreased appetite, dry mouth, constipation, irritability, increased heart rate, and increased blood pressure. Rarely, the medication may cause suicidal thoughts and behaviors. It can also activate mania or hypomania in people with bipolar disorder. Viloxazine acts as a selective norepinephrine reuptake inhibitor (sNRI). The immediate-release form has an elimination half-life of 2.5 hours while the half-life of the extended-release form is 7 hours.

Viloxazine was first described by 1972 and was marketed as an antidepressant in Europe in 1974. It was not marketed in the United States at this time. The medication was discontinued in 2002 for commercial reasons. However, it was repurposed for ADHD and was reintroduced, in the United States, in 2021. It is a non-stimulant medication; it has no known misuse liability and is not a controlled substance.

== Medical uses ==
=== Attention deficit hyperactivity disorder ===
Viloxazine is indicated to treat attention deficit hyperactivity disorder (ADHD) in children age 6 to 12 years, adolescents age 13 to 17 years, and adults.

Analyses of clinical trial data suggest that viloxazine produces moderate reductions in symptoms; it is about as effective as atomoxetine and methylphenidate but with fewer side effects.

=== Depression ===
Viloxazine was previously marketed as an antidepressant for the treatment of major depressive disorder. It was considered to be effective in mild to moderate as well as severe depression with or without co-morbid symptoms. The typical dose range for depression was 100 to 400 mg per day in divided doses administered generally two to three times per day.

=== Available forms ===
Viloxazine is available for ADHD in the form of 100, 150, and 200 mg extended-release capsules. These capsules can be opened and sprinkled into food for easier administration.

== Side effects ==
Viloxazine has a boxed warning in the United States regarding suicidal thoughts and behaviors. Its side effects in all ages include insomnia, headache, somnolence, fatigue, nausea, vomiting, decreased appetite, dry mouth, constipation, irritability, increased heart rate, increased blood pressure, and suicidal thoughts and behaviors. It can also activate mania or hypomania in people with bipolar disorder.

The most common side effects of viloxazine are somnolence, headache, and decreased appetite. Psychiatric side effects occur in about 20 percent of cases; the most common of these is irritability (>5 percent). Suicidal thoughts and behaviors were reported in 0.9 percent of pediatric patients and 1.6 percent of adult patients assigned to viloxazine groups in clinical trials. In placebo groups, suicidal thoughts and behaviors were reported in 0.4 percent of pediatric patients and zero percent of adult patients. Incidence of some side effects, including headache and drowsiness, may be dose-dependent.

== Interactions ==
Viloxazine increased plasma levels of phenytoin by an average of 37%. It also was known to significantly increase plasma levels of theophylline and decrease its clearance from the body, sometimes resulting in accidental overdose of theophylline.

== Pharmacology ==
=== Pharmacodynamics ===
Viloxazine acts as a selective norepinephrine reuptake inhibitor (sNRI) and this is believed to be responsible for its therapeutic effectiveness in the treatment of conditions like ADHD and depression. The affinities (K_{D}) of viloxazine at the human monoamine transporters are 155 to 630 nM for the norepinephrine transporter (NET), 17,300 nM for the serotonin transporter (SERT), and >100,000 nM for the dopamine transporter (DAT). Viloxazine has negligible affinity for a variety of assessed receptors, including the serotonin 5-HT_{1A} and 5-HT_{2A} receptors, the dopamine D_{2} receptor, the α_{1}- and α_{2}-adrenergic receptors, the histamine H_{1} receptor, and the muscarinic acetylcholine receptors (all >10,000 nM).

More recent research has found that the pharmacodynamics of viloxazine may be more complex than previously assumed. In 2020, viloxazine was reported to have significant affinity for the serotonin 5-HT_{2B} and 5-HT_{2C} receptors (K_{i} = 3,900 nM and 6,400 nM) and to act as an antagonist and agonist of these receptors, respectively. It also showed weak antagonistic activity at the serotonin 5-HT_{7} receptor and the α_{1B}- and β_{2}-adrenergic receptors. These actions, although relatively weak, might be involved in its effects and possibly its therapeutic effectiveness in the treatment of ADHD.

=== Pharmacokinetics ===
==== Absorption ====
The bioavailability of extended-release viloxazine relative to an instant-release formulation was about 88%. Peak and AUC levels of extended-release viloxazine are proportional over a dosage range of 100 to 400 mg once daily. The time to peak levels is 5 hours with a range of 3 to 9 hours after a single 200 mg dose. A high-fat meal modestly decreases levels of viloxazine and delays the time to peak by about 2 hours. Steady-state levels of viloxazine are reached after 2 days of once-daily administration and no accumulation occurs. Levels of viloxazine are approximately 40 to 50% higher in children age 6 to 11 years compared to children age 12 to 17 years.

==== Distribution ====
The plasma protein binding of viloxazine is 76 to 82% over a concentration range of 0.5 to 10 μg/mL.

==== Metabolism ====
The metabolism of viloxazine is primarily via the cytochrome P450 enzyme CYP2D6 and the UDP-glucuronosyltransferases UGT1A9 and UGT2B15. The major metabolite of viloxazine is 5-hydroxyviloxazine glucuronide. Viloxazine levels are slightly higher in CYP2D6 poor metabolizers relative to CYP2D6 extensive metabolizers.

==== Elimination ====
The elimination of viloxazine is mainly renal. Approximately 90% of the dose is excreted in urine within 24 hours and less than 1% of the dose is recovered in feces.

The elimination half-life of instant-release viloxazine is 2 to 5 hours (2–3 hours in the most reliable studies) and the half-life of extended-release viloxazine is 7.02 ± 4.74 hours.

== Chemistry ==
Viloxazine is a racemic compound with two stereoisomers, the (S)-(–)-isomer being five times as pharmacologically active as the (R)-(+)-isomer.

=== Analogues ===
Analogues of viloxazine include indeloxazine, reboxetine, and teniloxazine, among others.

== History ==
Viloxazine was discovered by scientists at Imperial Chemical Industries when they recognized that some beta blockers inhibited serotonin reuptake inhibitor activity in the brain at high doses. To improve the ability of their compounds to cross the blood brain barrier, they changed the ethanolamine side chain of beta blockers to a morpholine ring, leading to the synthesis of viloxazine. It was first described in the scientific literature as early as 1972.

The medication was first marketed in 1974. Viloxazine was not approved for medical use by the FDA. In 1984, the FDA granted the medication an orphan designation for treatment of cataplexy and narcolepsy with the tentative brand name Catatrol. For unknown reasons however, it was never approved or introduced for these uses in the United States. Viloxazine was withdrawn from markets worldwide in 2002 for commercial reasons unrelated to efficacy or safety.

As of 2015, Supernus Pharmaceuticals was developing extended release formulations of viloxazine as a treatment for ADHD and major depressive disorder under the names SPN-809 and SPN-812. Viloxazine was approved for the treatment of ADHD in the United States in April 2021.

The benefit of viloxazine was evaluated in three clinical studies, including two in children (ages 6 to 11 years) and one in adolescents (ages 12 to 17 years) with ADHD. In each study, pediatric participants were randomly assigned to receive one of two doses of viloxazine or placebo once daily for 6 to 8 weeks. None of the participants, their parent(s)/caregiver(s), the study sponsor, or the study doctors knew which treatment the participant received during the study. The severity of ADHD symptoms observed at the last week of treatment was significantly greater in participants who received placebo compared with participants who received viloxazine. The severity of ADHD symptoms was assessed using the Attention-Deficit Hyperactivity Disorder Rating Scale 5th Edition (ADHD-RS-5). A fourth study provided information about the safety of viloxazine in adolescents 12 to 17 years of age with ADHD. The FDA approved viloxazine based on evidence from several clinical trial(s) of 1289 participants with attention deficit hyperactivity disorder (ADHD). The trials were conducted at 59 sites in the United States.

== Society and culture ==
=== Brand names ===
Viloxazine has been marketed under the brand names Emovit, Qelbree, Vicilan, Viloxazin, Viloxazina, Viloxazinum, Vivalan, and Vivarint.

== Research ==
Viloxazine has undergone two randomized controlled trials for nocturnal enuresis (bedwetting) in children, both of those times versus imipramine. By 1990, it was seen as a less cardiotoxic alternative to imipramine, and to be especially effective in heavy sleepers.

In narcolepsy, viloxazine has been shown to suppress auxiliary symptoms such as cataplexy and also abnormal sleep-onset REM without significantly improving daytime somnolence. In a cross-over trial (56 participants) viloxazine significantly reduced EDS and cataplexy.

Viloxazine has also been studied for the treatment of alcoholism, with some success.

Viloxazine did not demonstrate efficacy in a double-blind randomized controlled trial versus amisulpride in the treatment of dysthymia.

== See also ==
- Indeloxazine
- Brilaroxazine
- Teniloxazine
