= Buphenine =

Medication

Clinical data
- Trade names: Arlidin
- Other names: Nylidrin
- AHFS/Drugs.com: International Drug Names
- ATC code: C04AA02 (WHO) G02CA02 (WHO)

Identifiers
- IUPAC name: 4-{1-hydroxy-2-[(1-methyl-3-phenylpropyl)amino]propyl}phenol
- CAS Number: 447-41-6
- PubChem CID: 4567
- ChemSpider: 4407
- UNII: 695DKH33EI
- ChEMBL: ChEMBL114655
- CompTox Dashboard (EPA): DTXSID4023387
- ECHA InfoCard: 100.006.531

Chemical and physical data
- Formula: C_{19}H_{25}NO_{2}
- Molar mass: 299.414 g·mol^{−1}
- 3D model (JSmol): Interactive image
- SMILES: OC(c1ccc(O)cc1)C(NC(C)CCc2ccccc2)C

Buphenine, also known as nylidrin and sold under the brand name Arlidin, is a β_{2} adrenoreceptor agonist that acts as a vasodilator.

It was developed as a chemical derivative of oxilofrine, and first reported in the literature in 1950.

== See also ==
- Isoxsuprine
