= Brilaroxazine =

Experimental atypical antipsychotic

Clinical data
- Other names: RP5063; oxaripiprazole
- Routes of administration: By mouth
- Drug class: Atypical antipsychotic

Legal status
- Legal status: US: Investigational New Drug

Pharmacokinetic data
- Bioavailability: >80%
- Protein binding: >99%
- Metabolism: Liver (mostly via CYP3A4 (64%) and CYP2D6 (17%))
- Elimination half-life: 55 hours

Identifiers
- IUPAC name: 6-[4-[4-(2,3-Dichlorophenyl)piperazin-1-yl]butoxy]-4H-1,4-benzoxazin-3-one
- CAS Number: 1239729-06-6 1708960-04-6 (hydrochloride)
- PubChem CID: 46861612
- DrugBank: DB09226
- ChemSpider: 64853808
- UNII: X8L60BA01I
- KEGG: D12813; D12814

Chemical and physical data
- Formula: C_{22}H_{25}Cl_{2}N_{3}O_{3}
- Molar mass: 450.36 g·mol^{−1}
- 3D model (JSmol): Interactive image
- SMILES: C1CN(CCN1CCCCOC2=CC3=C(C=C2)OCC(=O)N3)C4=C(C(=CC=C4)Cl)Cl
- InChI: InChI=1S/C22H25Cl2N3O3/c23-17-4-3-5-19(22(17)24)27-11-9-26(10-12-27)8-1-2-13-29-16-6-7-20-18(14-16)25-21(28)15-30-20/h3-7,14H,1-2,8-13,15H2,(H,25,28); Key:PMKMNTBZJOXTJW-UHFFFAOYSA-N

Brilaroxazine (developmental code name RP5063), also known as oxaripiprazole, is an investigational atypical antipsychotic which is under development by Reviva Pharmaceuticals for the treatment of neuropsychiatric and inflammatory disorders. It has currently completed the first of two phase III clinical trials for schizophrenia. Reviva Pharmaceuticals also intends to investigate brilaroxazine for the treatment of schizoaffective disorder, bipolar disorder, major depressive disorder, attention deficit hyperactivity disorder (ADHD), irritability in autism, tics, psychosis/agitation associated with Alzheimer's disease, Parkinson's disease psychosis, as well as the inflammatory disorders pulmonary arterial hypertension (PAH), idiopathic pulmonary fibrosis (IPF), and psoriasis (topical gel). The FDA granted brilaroxazine orphan drug designation for the treatment of PAH and IPF.

Brilaroxazine is a third-generation antipsychotic drug and dopamine-serotonin system modulator due to its unique actions on dopamine and serotonin neurotransmitter systems compared to other antipsychotics. Clinical data from phase I, phase II (NCT01490086), and phase III (NCT05184335) trials suggest that brilaroxazine may have favorable efficacy and a significantly improved side effect profile compared to existing second and third-generation antipsychotics.

== Pharmacology ==
=== Pharmacodynamics ===
Brilaroxazine acts as a potent partial agonist of D_{2}, D_{3}, D_{4} and 5-HT_{1A}, 5-HT_{2A} receptors, and as an antagonist of 5-HT_{2B}, 5-HT_{2C}, 5-HT_{6} and 5-HT_{7} receptors. Brilaroxazine exhibits high affinity for D_{2S}, D_{2L}, D_{3}, D_{4.4}, 5-HT_{1A}, 5-HT_{2A}, 5-HT_{2B}, and 5-HT_{7} receptors, and moderate affinity for D_{1}, D_{5}, 5-HT_{2C}, 5-HT_{3}, 5-HT_{6}, H_{1} and α_{4}β_{2} nicotinic receptors, the serotonin transporter, and the α_{1B} adrenergic receptor. It lacks significant affinity for 5-HT_{1B}, α_{2} adrenergic, and muscarinic acetylcholine receptors, as well as for the norepinephrine and dopamine transporters.

Binding profile
| Site | K_{i} (nM) | Action |
|---|---|---|
| D_{1} | 100 | ND |
| D_{2} | 0.40 | Partial agonist |
| D_{2L} | 0.45 | Partial agonist |
| D_{2S} | 0.28 | Partial agonist |
| D_{3} | 3.7 | Partial agonist |
| D_{4} | 6.0 | Partial agonist |
| D_{5} | 200 | ND |
| 5-HT_{1A} | 1.5 | Partial agonist |
| 5-HT_{2A} | 2.5 | Weak partial agonist |
| 5-HT_{2B} | 0.19 | Antagonist |
| 5-HT_{2C} | 39 | Antagonist |
| 5-HT_{3} | 78 | ND |
| 5-HT_{6} | 51 | Antagonist |
| 5-HT_{7} | 2.7 | Antagonist |
| α_{4}β_{2} nicotinic | 36.3 | ND |
| SERT | 107 | ND |
Values are K_{i} (nM). The smaller the value, the more strongly the drug binds to the site.

== Chemistry ==
Brilaroxazine is identical to aripiprazole in chemical structure except for the replacement of a methylene group in aripiprazole's quinolinone ring system with an oxygen atom, resulting instead in a benzoxazinone ring system. This structural change is within the molecule's secondary pharmacophore, which plays a major role in modulating its binding and intrinsic efficacy at dopamine and serotonin receptors. The drug is also related structurally to brexpiprazole and cariprazine.

== Recent Developments ==
In October 2023, Reviva Pharmaceuticals released topline results from their pivotal RECOVER phase III clinical trial (NCT05184335). The RECOVER study was a 4-week, randomized, double-blind, placebo-controlled, multicenter trial where 411 patients with schizophrenia received brilaroxazine 15 mg, 50 mg, or placebo once daily. The trial cohort consisted of 60% American, 34% Indian, and 6% Bulgarian patients with balanced randomization and diverse demographic representation across all three trial arms. The primary endpoint was PANSS Total Score change from baseline vs placebo at week 4. Secondary endpoints were PANSS Positive Symptoms, PANSS Negative Symptoms, PANSS Negative Marder Factor, PANSS Social Cognition, PANSS Excitement/Agitation, CGI-S, and Personal and Social Performance (PSP) score changes from baseline vs placebo at week 4.

Brilaroxazine 50 mg successfully met all primary and secondary endpoints with statistically significant and clinically meaningful improvements over placebo across all major symptom domains. The primary endpoint PANSS Total Score change from baseline was -23.9 for brilaroxazine 50 mg vs -13.8 for placebo at week 4, resulting in a 10.1 point reduction over placebo (p < 0.001). Within the first week of dosing, brilaroxazine 50 mg already achieved separation from placebo in the primary endpoint and several secondary endpoints.

Reviva announced that a Pre NDA meeting with the US FDA was expected late 2025 in regard to submitting a New Drug Application based on clinical trial results to date.

RECOVER Phase III Trial Brilaroxazine 50 mg vs Placebo at Week 4
| Endpoint | Point Reduction / Improvement | Cohen's d Effect Size | P Value |
|---|---|---|---|
| PANSS Total Score | 10.1 | 0.6 | <0.001 |
| PANSS Positive Symptoms | 2.8 | 0.5 | <0.001 |
| PANSS Negative Symptoms | 2.0 | 0.4 | 0.003 |
| PANSS Negative Marder Factor | 2.1 | 0.4 | 0.002 |
| PANSS Social Cognition | 1.6 | 0.5 | <0.001 |
| PANSS Excitement/Agitation | 2.1 | 0.5 | <0.001 |
| Personal and Social Performance (PSP) | 6.3 | 0.5 | <0.001 |
| CGI-S | >= 1 | 0.5 | <0.001 |

The lower brilaroxazine 15 mg dose met two secondary endpoints at week 4, PANSS Social Cognition and Personal and Social Performance (PSP), and showed a clear improvement trend and increasing separation from placebo in the primary endpoint PANSS Total Score and PANSS Positive Symptoms score starting at week 3.

Brilaroxazine was very well tolerated and safe, with overall treatment emergent adverse event (TEAE) rates of 34.5% for brilaroxazine 15 mg, 35.5% for 50 mg, and 30% for placebo. Discontinuation rates for brilaroxazine were lower than for placebo and were 19% for brilaroxazine 15 mg, 16% for 50 mg, and 22% for placebo. Discontinuation rates due to drug side effects were also lower for brilaroxazine than for placebo and were 1% for brilaroxazine 15 mg, 0% for 50 mg, and 4% for placebo. Common TEAEs (>5%) were headache (<6%) and somnolence (<=7.5%) but these were mild-to-moderate in severity and generally transient in nature. There were no incidences of suicidal ideation.

There was no >=7% mean change in bodyweight, blood glucose, lipids, prolactin, or thyroid hormones compared to placebo. The percentage of patients who gained weight during the trial was 2.1% for brilaroxazine 15 mg, 5.9% for 50 mg, and 2.9% for placebo. This is a significant improvement over the currently prescribed third-generation antipsychotics aripiprazole (Abilify), brexpiprazole (Rexulti), and cariprazine (Vraylar). In comparable short-term (4-6 week) acute schizophrenia clinical trials, the percentage of patients taking a third-generation antipsychotic that had clinically relevant weight gain (>= 7% gain) was 9.2% for aripiprazole vs 4.3% for placebo, 10.4% for brexpiprazole vs 4.1% for placebo, and 9.2% for cariprazine vs 4.7% for placebo. Cariprazine had a 3% weight gain over placebo on its highest dose which was equivalent to the weight gain for brilaroxazine.

Akathisia and extrapyramidal symptom (EPS) rates were very low and were 0% for brilaroxazine 15mg, 0.7% for 50 mg, and 0% for placebo. The percentage of patients with elevated LDL cholesterol compared to baseline was 0% for brilaroxazine 15 and 50 mg vs 2.9% for placebo, and the percentage of patients with low HDL cholesterol compared to baseline was 0.7% for brilaroxazine 15 mg, 1.4% for 50 mg, and 1.4% for placebo.

Reviva also has an ongoing 52-week, single-arm, phase III open-label extension (OLE) study of stable schizophrenia patients to further evaluate the long-term safety and tolerability of brilaroxazine as part of the RECOVER program (NCT05184335). In this study, rollover patients from the RECOVER 4-week double-blind trial as well as de novo stable schizophrenia patients receive brilaroxazine in a 15-30-50 mg flexible dosing schedule. Completion is expected in Q4 2024. In Q1 2024 Reviva plans to initiate RECOVER-2 in Q2 2024. RECOVER-2 is a confirmatory 4-week, randomized, double-blind, placebo-controlled, multicenter phase III clinical trial of 450 acute schizophrenia patients, where patients will receive brilaroxazine 30 mg, 50 mg, or placebo once daily. Completion is expected in Q2 2025 and brilaroxazine FDA new drug application (NDA) submission is expected in Q3 2025. If successful, commercial availability is anticipated by 2026.

== See also ==
- Indeloxazine
- Viloxazine
- Teniloxazine
- List of investigational antipsychotics
- List of investigational antidepressants
- List of investigational bipolar disorder drugs
