= Taminadenant =

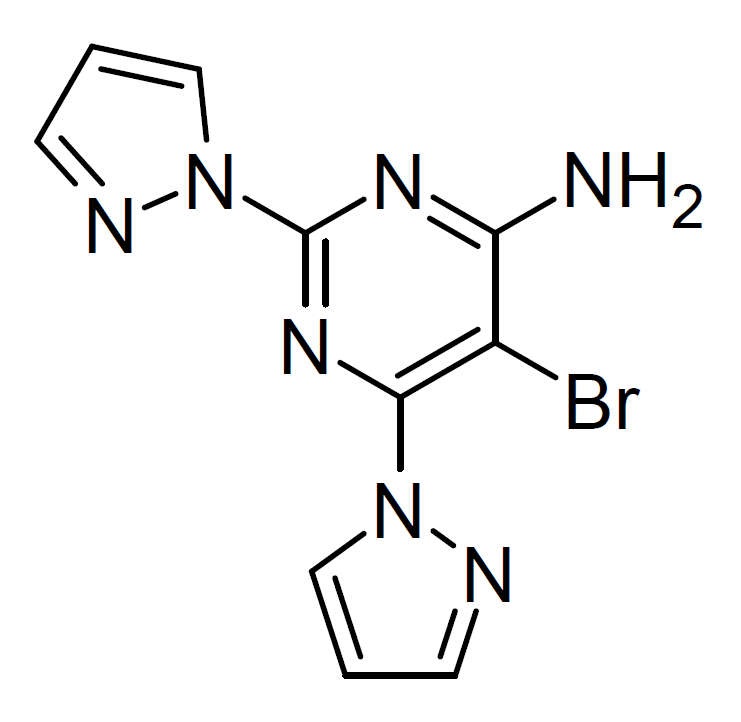

Identifiers
- IUPAC name: 5-bromo-2,6-di(pyrazol-1-yl)pyrimidin-4-amine
- CAS Number: 1337962-47-6
- PubChem CID: 53466958
- DrugBank: DB18811
- ChemSpider: 58810193
- UNII: 84I5UEP321
- ChEMBL: ChEMBL3694769

Chemical and physical data
- Formula: C_{10}H_{8}BrN_{7}
- Molar mass: 306.127 g·mol^{−1}
- 3D model (JSmol): Interactive image
- SMILES: C1=CN(N=C1)C2=NC(=NC(=C2Br)N)N3C=CC=N3
- InChI: InChI=1S/C10H8BrN7/c11-7-8(12)15-10(18-6-2-4-14-18)16-9(7)17-5-1-3-13-17/h1-6H,(H2,12,15,16); Key:ATFXVNUWQOXRRU-UHFFFAOYSA-N

Taminadenant (PBF509) is an experimental drug which acts as a selective inhibitor of the adenosine A2A receptor. It is in clinical trials for the treatment of lung cancer, and has also shown potential for applications in the treatment of movement disorders.
