= Bifemelane =

Antidepressant and cerebral activator drug

- Molecular structure of bifemelane

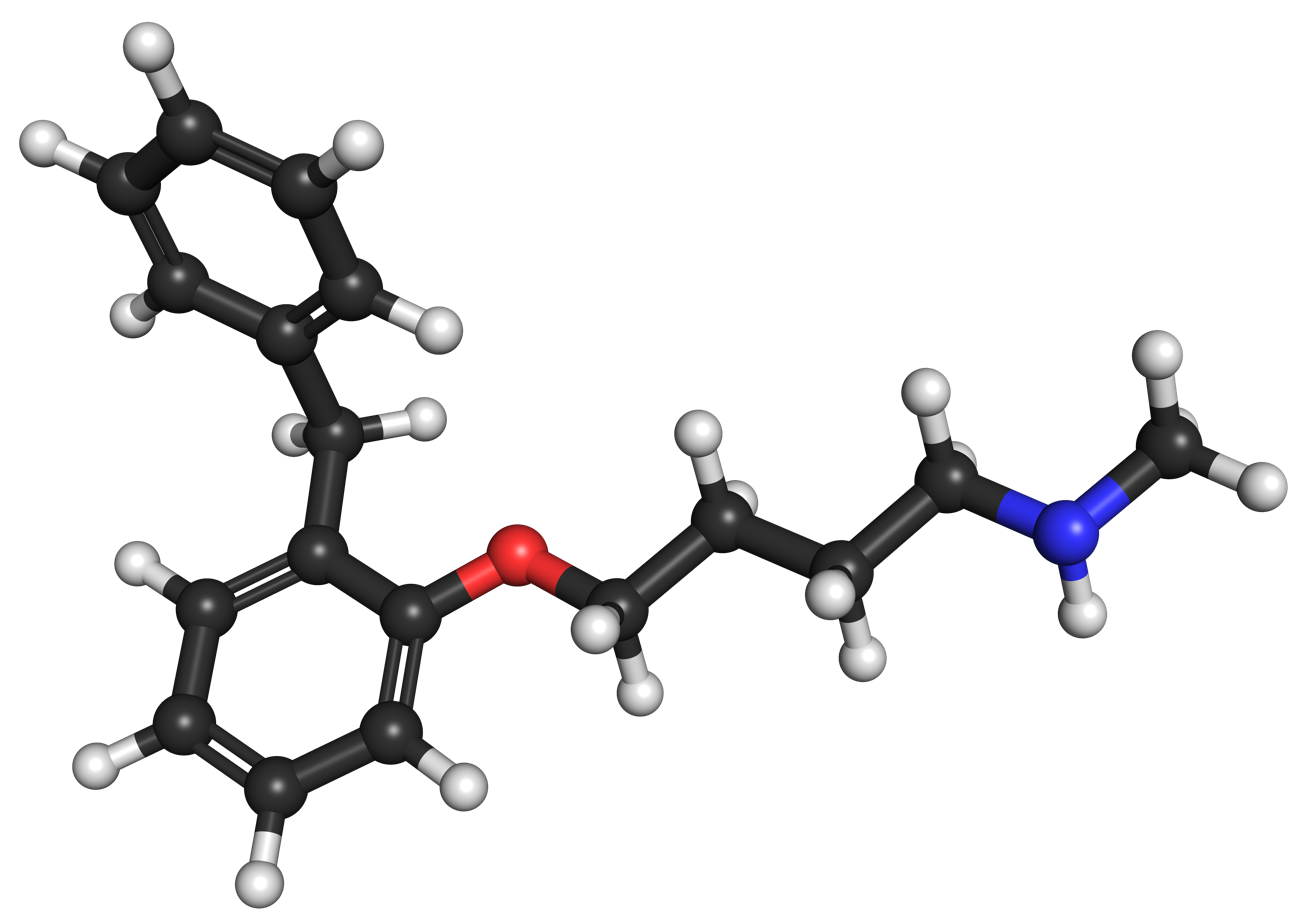
- 3D representation of a bifemelane molecule

Clinical data
- Trade names: Alnert, Celeport
- Other names: MCl-2016, 4-(O-benzylphenoxy)-N-methylbutylamine
- AHFS/Drugs.com: International Drug Names
- ATC code: N06AX08 (WHO)

Identifiers
- IUPAC name: N-methyl-4-[2-(phenylmethyl)phenoxy]butan-1-amine
- CAS Number: 90293-01-9
- PubChem CID: 2377
- ChemSpider: 2286
- UNII: Z4501GN13G
- ChEMBL: ChEMBL1192517
- CompTox Dashboard (EPA): DTXSID1045663
- ECHA InfoCard: 100.220.566

Chemical and physical data
- Formula: C_{18}H_{23}NO
- Molar mass: 269.388 g·mol^{−1}
- 3D model (JSmol): Interactive image
- SMILES: O(c1ccccc1Cc2ccccc2)CCCCNC
- InChI: InChI=1S/C18H23NO/c1-19-13-7-8-14-20-18-12-6-5-11-17(18)15-16-9-3-2-4-10-16/h2-6,9-12,19H,7-8,13-15H2,1H3; Key:QSQQPMHPCBLLGX-UHFFFAOYSA-N

Bifemelane (INN), sold under the brand names Alnert and Celeport, is an antidepressant and cerebral activator that was widely used in the treatment of cerebral infarction patients with depressive symptoms in Japan, and in the treatment of dementia as well. It also appears to be useful in the treatment of glaucoma. It has been discontinued in Japan since 1998, when it was removed from the market reportedly for lack of effectiveness.

Bifemelane acts as a monoamine oxidase inhibitor (MAOI) of both isoenzymes, with competitive reversible inhibition of MAO-A (K_{i} = 4.20 μM), making it a reversible inhibitor of monoamine oxidase A (RIMA) and non-competitive irreversible inhibition of MAO-B (K_{i} = 46.0 μM), and also acts (weakly) as a norepinephrine reuptake inhibitor (NRI). The drug has nootropic, neuroprotective, and antidepressant-like effects in animal models, and appears to enhance the cholinergic system in the brain.

== See also ==
- Indeloxazine
- Teniloxazine
