= Teniloxazine =

Chemical compound

Clinical data
- Other names: Y-8894
- Routes of administration: Oral
- ATC code: None

Legal status
- Legal status: In general: ℞ (Prescription only)

Identifiers
- IUPAC name: 2-{[2-(thiophen-2-ylmethyl)phenoxy]methyl}morpholine
- CAS Number: 62473-79-4 62473-80-7 (maleate)
- PubChem CID: 119114
- ChemSpider: 106426
- UNII: 95Q6WNP25P
- ChEMBL: ChEMBL2105438
- CompTox Dashboard (EPA): DTXSID10866932

Chemical and physical data
- Formula: C_{16}H_{19}NO_{2}S
- Molar mass: 289.39 g·mol^{−1}
- 3D model (JSmol): Interactive image
- SMILES: O1CCNCC1COc2ccccc2Cc3sccc3
- InChI: InChI=1S/C16H19NO2S/c1-2-6-16(19-12-14-11-17-7-8-18-14)13(4-1)10-15-5-3-9-20-15/h1-6,9,14,17H,7-8,10-12H2; Key:OILWWIVKIDXCIB-UHFFFAOYSA-N

Teniloxazine (Lucelan, Metatone), also known as sufoxazine and sulfoxazine, is a drug which is marketed in Japan. Though initially investigated as a neuroprotective and nootropic agent for the treatment of cerebrovascular insufficiency in the 1980s, it was ultimately developed and approved as an antidepressant instead. It acts as a potent norepinephrine reuptake inhibitor, with fair selectivity over the serotonin and dopamine transporters, and also behaves as an antagonist of the 5-HT_{2A} receptor.

== Synthesis ==
ChemDrug Synthesis: Patents: Cerebrovascular dementia usage:

Amide formation between 1-(Benzylamino)-3-{2-[(thiophen-2-yl)methyl]phenoxy}propan-2-ol [62473-86-3] (1) and Chloroacetylchloride [79-04-9] (2) gives PC13682456 (3). In the presence of sodium metal closing of the ring morpholine occurs to give PC13682470 (4). Lactam reduction with lithium aluminium hydride affords 4-Benzyl-2-({2-[(thiophen-2-yl)methyl]phenoxy}methyl)morpholine [62473-77-2] (5). Treatment with Ethyl chloroformate [541-41-3] (6) gives the urethane and hence 4-Ethoxycarbonyl-2-[2-(2-thenyl)-phenoxymethyl]morpholine, PC21482171 (7). Hydrolysis of the carbamate in the presence of barium hydroxide completes the synthesis of Teniloxazine (8).

Alternately, base reaction between 1-[2-(2-thenyl)phenoxy]-2,3-epoxypropane [55506-46-2] (9) and 2-Aminoethyl hydrogen sulfate [926-39-6] (10) is another way to perform the synthesis.

== See also ==
- Bifemelane
- Indeloxazine
- Viloxazine
- Brilaroxazine
