= Serdexmethylphenidate/dexmethylphenidate =

Combination drug

Combination of
- Serdexmethylphenidate: Prodrug of dexmethylphenidate
- Dexmethylphenidate: Catecholamine reuptake inhibitor

Clinical data
- Trade names: Azstarys
- Other names: KP415
- AHFS/Drugs.com: Micromedex Detailed Consumer Information
- License data: US DailyMed: Azstarys
- Routes of administration: By mouth
- ATC code: N06BA15 (WHO)

Legal status
- Legal status: US: Schedule II

Identifiers
- KEGG: D11989

Serdexmethylphenidate/dexmethylphenidate, sold under the brand name Azstarys, is a fixed-dose combination medication containing serdexmethylphenidate, a prodrug of dexmethylphenidate, and dexmethylphenidate, a d-threo enantiomer of racemic methylphenidate, which is used to treat attention deficit hyperactivity disorder (ADHD) in people aged six years and older.

Side effects include decreased appetite, nausea, indigestion, weight loss, dizziness, mood swings, increased blood pressure, trouble sleeping, vomiting, stomach pain, anxiety, irritability, and increased heart rate.

It was approved for medical use in the United States in March 2021.

== Medical uses ==
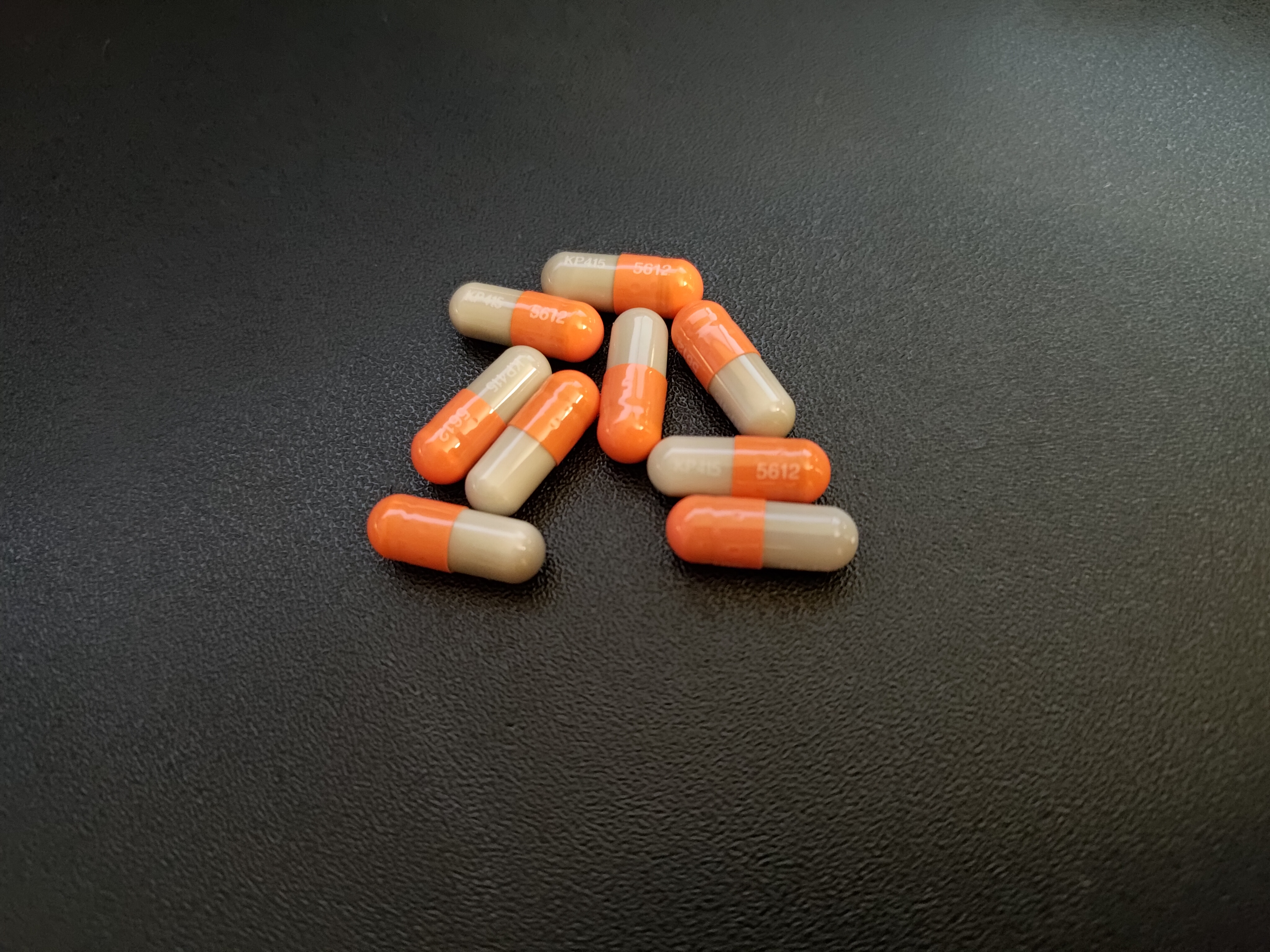
52.3 mg/10.4 mg Azstarys capsules

Serdexmethylphenidate/dexmethylphenidate is indicated for the treatment of attention deficit hyperactivity disorder in people six years of age and older.

== Pharmacology ==
=== Pharmacokinetics ===
When administered orally in a 70:30 molar ratio, serdexmethylphenidate/dexmethylphenidate produces a dexmethylphenidate plasma concentration profile with a time to maximum concentration T_{max} of approximately 2 hours and an mean terminal elimination half-life of 11.7 hours.

== History ==
The US Food and Drug Administration (FDA) approved serdexmethylphenidate/dexmethylphenidate based on evidence from one clinical trial of 150 participants with attention deficit hyperactivity disorder 6 to 12 years of age (Study 1). The four-week trial was conducted at five sites in the United States. The safety and tolerability of serdexmethylphenidate/dexmethylphenidate was examined in an open-label trial of 238 participants with attention deficit hyperactivity disorder 6 to 12 years of age (Study 2). The 12-month trial was conducted at 18 sites in the United States.
