= Indeloxazine =

Antidepressant and cerebral activator

- Skeletal structure of indeloxazine

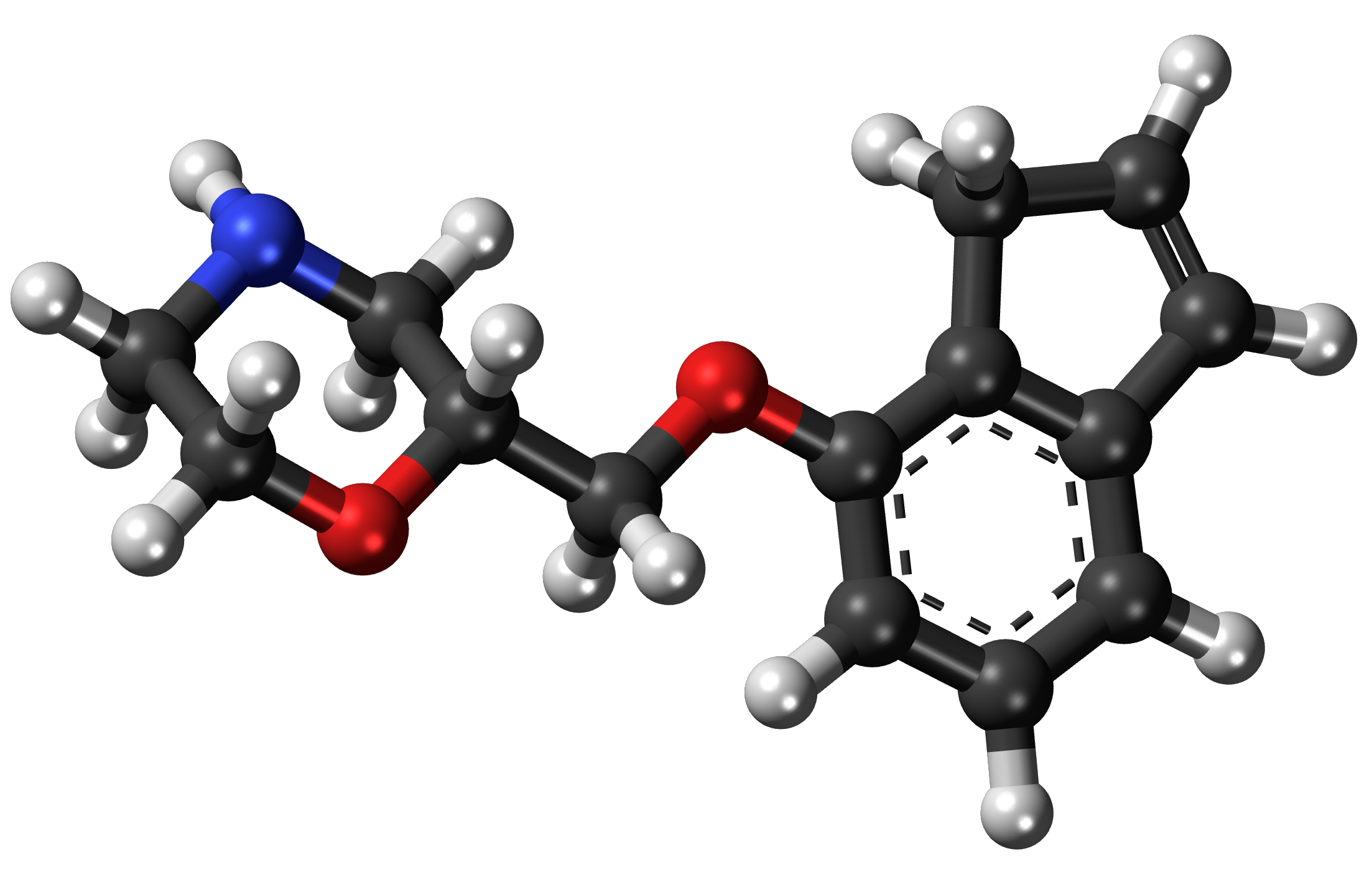
- 3D representation of an indeloxazine molecule

Clinical data
- Other names: CI-874, YM-08054
- ATC code: None

Legal status
- Legal status: Discontinued

Identifiers
- IUPAC name: 2-(3H-Inden-4-yloxymethyl)morpholine
- CAS Number: 60929-23-9
- PubChem CID: 3704
- ChemSpider: 3576
- UNII: 834M09R1KM
- KEGG: D08077
- CompTox Dashboard (EPA): DTXSID30866833

Chemical and physical data
- Formula: C_{14}H_{17}NO_{2}
- Molar mass: 231.295 g·mol^{−1}
- 3D model (JSmol): Interactive image
- SMILES: O(c1cccc2\C=C/Cc12)CC3OCCNC3
- InChI: InChI=1S/C14H17NO2/c1-3-11-4-2-6-14(13(11)5-1)17-10-12-9-15-7-8-16-12/h1-4,6,12,15H,5,7-10H2; Key:MADRVGBADLFHMO-UHFFFAOYSA-N

Indeloxazine (INN; trade names Elen and Noin) is an antidepressant and cerebral activator that was marketed in Japan and South Korea by Yamanouchi Pharmaceutical Co., Ltd for the treatment of psychiatric symptoms associated with cerebrovascular diseases, namely depression resulting from stroke, emotional disturbance, and avolition. It was marketed from 1988 to 1998, when it was removed from the market reportedly for lack of effectiveness.

Indeloxazine acts as a serotonin releasing agent, norepinephrine reuptake inhibitor, and NMDA receptor antagonist. It has been found to enhance acetylcholine release in the rat forebrain through activation of the 5-HT_{4} receptor via its action as a serotonin releasing agent. The drug has been found to possess nootropic, neuroprotective, anticonvulsant, and antidepressant-like effects in animal models.

== See also ==
- Teniloxazine
- Viloxazine
- Brilaroxazine
