= Isoxsuprine =

Group of stereoisomers

Clinical data
- Pronunciation: /aɪˈsɒksjʊpriːn/
- Trade names: Duvadilan, Vasodilan
- MedlinePlus: a682831
- Routes of administration: Oral (tablets)
- ATC code: C04AA01 (WHO)

Legal status
- Legal status: In general: ℞ (Prescription only)

Pharmacokinetic data
- Bioavailability: ~100% (humans), 2.2% (horses; oral)
- Onset of action: 1 hour
- Elimination half-life: <3 hours (horses)
- Excretion: Mainly renal

Identifiers
- IUPAC name: 4-{1-Hydroxy-2-[(1-methyl-2-phenoxyethyl)amino]propyl}phenol
- CAS Number: 395-28-8
- PubChem CID: 3783
- DrugBank: DB08941
- ChemSpider: 3651
- UNII: R15UI3245N
- KEGG: D08092
- ChEMBL: ChEMBL1197051
- CompTox Dashboard (EPA): DTXSID9023178
- ECHA InfoCard: 100.006.272

Chemical and physical data
- Formula: C_{18}H_{23}NO_{3}
- Molar mass: 301.386 g·mol^{−1}
- 3D model (JSmol): Interactive image
- SMILES: O(c1ccccc1)CC(NC(C)C(O)c2ccc(O)cc2)C
- InChI: InChI=1S/C18H23NO3/c1-13(12-22-17-6-4-3-5-7-17)19-14(2)18(21)15-8-10-16(20)11-9-15/h3-11,13-14,18-21H,12H2,1-2H3; Key:BMUKKTUHUDJSNZ-UHFFFAOYSA-N

Isoxsuprine (used as isoxsuprine hydrochloride) is a drug used as a vasodilator in humans (under the trade name Duvadilan) and equines. Isoxsuprine is a β_{2} adrenoreceptor agonist that causes direct relaxation of uterine and vascular smooth muscle via β_{2} receptors.

== Use ==
=== In humans ===
Isoxsuprine is used in humans for treatment of premature labor, i.e. a tocolytic, and as a vasodilator for the treatment of cerebral vascular insufficiency, Raynaud's phenomenon, and other conditions.

Isoxsuprine may increase the heart rate, cause changes in blood pressure, and irritate the GI tract. It should therefore be used with caution if combined with other drugs that affect blood pressure, such as sedatives and anesthetic drugs.

=== In horses ===
Isoxsuprine is most commonly used to treat hoof-related problems in the horse, most commonly for laminitis and navicular disease, as its effects as a vasodilator are thought to increase circulation within the hoof to help counteract the problems associated with these conditions. Isoxsuprine is given orally, and many horses find the pills quite palatable. Isoxsuprine is a prohibited class B drug in FEI-regulated competition, and is often prohibited by other equine associations. It may be detected in the urine for several weeks or months following administration. It is therefore important to check the drug-rules within an animal's given competitive organization, before administering the drug.

Because it is a vasodilator, it should not be used in horses that are bleeding, or in mares following foaling.
