= Sabeluzole =

Chemical compound

Clinical data
- ATC code: none

Legal status
- Legal status: In general: unscheduled

Identifiers
- IUPAC name: 1-[4-[1,3-benzothiazol-2-yl(methyl)amino]piperidin-1-yl]-3-(4-fluorophenoxy)propan-2-ol
- CAS Number: 104383-17-7
- PubChem CID: 59823
- ChemSpider: 53964
- UNII: A998504XY4
- CompTox Dashboard (EPA): DTXSID60869418

Chemical and physical data
- Formula: C_{22}H_{26}FN_{3}O_{2}S
- Molar mass: 415.53 g·mol^{−1}
- 3D model (JSmol): Interactive image
- SMILES: CN(C1CCN(CC1)CC(COC2=CC=C(C=C2)F)O)C3=NC4=CC=CC=C4S3
- InChI: InChI=1S/C22H26FN3O2S/c1-25(22-24-20-4-2-3-5-21(20)29-22)17-10-12-26(13-11-17)14-18(27)15-28-19-8-6-16(23)7-9-19/h2-9,17-18,27H,10-15H2,1H3; Key:IGMKTIJBFUMVIN-UHFFFAOYSA-N

Sabeluzole (R-58,735) is a nootropic and neuroprotective drug which was originally developed for the treatment of Alzheimer's disease, and has subsequently been researched for other applications such as sleep apnoea. It acts primarily as an NMDA antagonist, but other mechanisms of action may also be important.

== See also ==
- Memantine
