= ATC code N06 =

Pharmaceutical drug classification

ATC code N06 Psychoanaleptics is a therapeutic subgroup of the Anatomical Therapeutic Chemical Classification System, a system of alphanumeric codes developed by the World Health Organization (WHO) for the classification of drugs and other medical products. Subgroup N06 is part of the anatomical group N Nervous system.

Codes for veterinary use (ATCvet codes) can be created by placing the letter Q in front of the human ATC code: for example, QN06. ATCvet codes without corresponding human ATC codes are cited with the leading Q in the following list.
National versions of the ATC classification may include additional codes not present in this list, which follows the WHO version.

== N06A Antidepressants ==
=== N06AA Non-selective monoamine reuptake inhibitors ===
N06AA01 Desipramine
N06AA02 Imipramine
N06AA03 Imipramine oxide
N06AA04 Clomipramine
N06AA05 Opipramol
N06AA06 Trimipramine
N06AA07 Lofepramine
N06AA08 Dibenzepin
N06AA09 Amitriptyline
N06AA10 Nortriptyline
N06AA11 Protriptyline
N06AA12 Doxepin
N06AA13 Iprindole
N06AA14 Melitracen
N06AA15 Butriptyline
N06AA16 Dosulepin
N06AA17 Amoxapine
N06AA18 Dimetacrine
N06AA19 Amineptine
N06AA20 Noxiptiline
N06AA21 Maprotiline
N06AA23 Quinupramine
N06AA25 Amitripylinoxide

=== N06AB Selective serotonin reuptake inhibitors ===
N06AB02 Zimelidine
N06AB03 Fluoxetine
N06AB04 Citalopram
N06AB05 Paroxetine
N06AB06 Sertraline
N06AB07 Alaproclate
N06AB08 Fluvoxamine
N06AB09 Etoperidone
N06AB10 Escitalopram

=== N06AF Monoamine oxidase inhibitors, non-selective ===
N06AF01 Isocarboxazid
N06AF02 Nialamide
N06AF03 Phenelzine
N06AF04 Tranylcypromine
N06AF05 Iproniazide
N06AF06 Iproclozide

=== N06AG Monoamine oxidase A inhibitors ===
N06AG02 Moclobemide
N06AG03 Toloxatone

=== N06AH Homeopathic and anthroposophical antidepressants ===
N06AH01 Hypericum
N06AH10 Various

=== N06AP Herbal antidepressants ===
N06AP01 - St. John's wort
N06AP51 - St. John's wort, combinations

=== N06AX Other antidepressants ===
N06AX01 Oxitriptan
N06AX02 Tryptophan
N06AX03 Mianserin
N06AX04 Nomifensin
N06AX05 Trazodone
N06AX06 Nefazodone
N06AX07 Minaprine
N06AX08 Bifemelane
N06AX09 Viloxazine
N06AX10 Oxaflozane
N06AX11 Mirtazapine
N06AX12 Bupropion
N06AX13 Medifoxamine
N06AX14 Tianeptine
N06AX15 Pivagabine
N06AX16 Venlafaxine
N06AX17 Milnacipran
N06AX18 Reboxetine
N06AX19 Gepirone
N06AX21 Duloxetine
N06AX22 Agomelatine
N06AX23 Desvenlafaxine
N06AX24 Vilazodone
N06AX26 Vortioxetine
N06AX27 Esketamine
N06AX28 Levomilnacipran
N06AX29 Brexanolone
N06AX31 Zuranolone
N06AX35 Pipofezine
N06AX62 Bupropion and dextromethorphan

== N06B Psychostimulants, agents used for ADHD and nootropics ==
=== N06BA Centrally acting sympathomimetics ===
N06BA01 Amphetamine
N06BA02 Dexamphetamine
N06BA03 Methamphetamine
N06BA04 Methylphenidate
N06BA05 Pemoline
N06BA06 Fencamfamin
N06BA07 Modafinil
N06BA08 Fenozolone
N06BA09 Atomoxetine
N06BA10 Fenetylline
N06BA11 Dexmethylphenidate
N06BA12 Lisdexamfetamine
N06BA13 Armodafinil
N06BA14 Solriamfetol
N06BA15 Dexmethylphenidate and serdexmethylphenidate
N06BA16 Amfetaminil
N06BA17 Mesocarb
N06BA21 Guanfacine

=== N06BC Xanthine derivatives ===
N06BC01 Caffeine
N06BC02 Propentofylline

=== N06BX Other psychostimulants and nootropics ===
N06BX01 Meclofenoxate
N06BX02 Pyritinol
N06BX03 Piracetam
N06BX04 Deanol
N06BX05 Fipexide
N06BX06 Citicoline
N06BX07 Oxiracetam
N06BX08 Pirisudanol
N06BX09 Linopirdine
N06BX10 Nizofenone
N06BX11 Aniracetam
N06BX12 Acetylcarnitine
N06BX13 Idebenone
N06BX14 Prolintane
N06BX15 Pipradrol
N06BX16 Pramiracetam
N06BX17 Adrafinil
N06BX18 Vinpocetine
N06BX21 Temgicoluril
N06BX22 Phenibut
N06BX53 Piracetam and cinnarizine
N06BX54 Deanol, combinations
N06BX64 Prolintane, combinations

== N06C Psycholeptics and psychoanaleptics in combination ==
=== N06CA Antidepressants in combination with psycholeptics ===
N06CA01 Amitriptyline and psycholeptics
N06CA02 Melitracen and psycholeptics
N06CA03 Fluoxetine and psycholeptics
N06CA04 Oxitriptan and psycholeptics
N06CA05 Nomifensine and psycholeptics
N06CA06 Nortriptyline and psycholeptics
N06CA07 Tranylcypromine and psycholeptics
N06CA10 Dosulepin and psycholeptics

=== N06CB Psychostimulants in combination with psycholeptics ===
This group is empty.

== N06D Anti-dementia drugs ==
=== N06DA Anticholinesterases ===
N06DA01 Tacrine
N06DA02 Donepezil
N06DA03 Rivastigmine
N06DA04 Galantamine
N06DA05 Ipidacrine
N06DA06 Benzgalantamine
N06DA52 Donepezil and memantine
N06DA53 Donepezil, memantine and ginkgo biloba leaf dry extract

=== N06DP Herbal anti-dementia drugs ===
N06DP01 Ginkgo biloba leaf dry extract

=== N06DX Other anti-dementia drugs ===
N06DX01 Memantine
N06DX03 Aducanumab
N06DX04 Lecanemab
N06DX05 Donanemab
N06DX06 Blarcamesine
N06DX07 Hydromethylthionine
N06DX08 Viquidil
N06DX09 Vincamine
N06DX10 Calf blood extract, incl. combinations
N06DX11 Bencyclane
N06DX12 Cinnarizine
N06DX13 Nicergoline
N06DX14 Cyclandelate
N06DX15 Xantinol nicotinate
N06DX16 Pentifylline
N06DX17 Nicotinyl alcohol (pyridylcarbinol)
N06DX18 Nimodipine
N06DX19 Dihydroergocristine
N06DX20 Organ extracts
N06DX21 Dihydroergotoxine
N06DX30 Combinations
N06DX66 Pentifylline, combinations
N06DX71 Dihydroergotoxine, combinations
