= C15H21NO4 =

The molecular formula C_{15}H_{21}NO_{4} (molar mass: 279.33 g/mol, exact mass: 279.1471 u) may refer to:

- Afurolol
- Metalaxyl
