= Fipexide =

Chemical compound

Clinical data
- ATC code: N06BX05 (WHO)

Identifiers
- IUPAC name: 1-[4-(1,3-benzodioxol-5-ylmethyl)piperazin-1-yl]- 2-(4-chlorophenoxy)ethanone
- CAS Number: 34161-24-5
- PubChem CID: 3351
- ChemSpider: 3234
- UNII: TG44VME01D
- KEGG: D07345
- ChEMBL: ChEMBL254857
- CompTox Dashboard (EPA): DTXSID5044657
- ECHA InfoCard: 100.047.128

Chemical and physical data
- Formula: C_{20}H_{21}ClN_{2}O_{4}
- Molar mass: 388.85 g·mol^{−1}
- 3D model (JSmol): Interactive image
- SMILES: Clc4ccc(OCC(=O)N1CCN(CC1)Cc2ccc3OCOc3c2)cc4
- InChI: InChI=1S/C20H21ClN2O4/c21-16-2-4-17(5-3-16)25-13-20(24)23-9-7-22(8-10-23)12-15-1-6-18-19(11-15)27-14-26-18/h1-6,11H,7-10,12-14H2; Key:BFUJHVVEMMWLHC-UHFFFAOYSA-N

Fipexide (Attentil, Vigilor) is a psychoactive drug of the piperazine chemical class which was developed in Italy in 1983. It was used as a nootropic drug in Italy and France, mainly for the treatment of senile dementia, but is no longer in common use due to the occurrence of rare adverse drug reactions including fever and hepatitis. Fipexide is similar in action to other nootropic drugs such as piracetam and has a few similarities in chemical structure to centrophenoxine. Chemically, it is an amide union of parachlorophenoxyacetate and methylenedioxybenzylpiperazine (MDBZP), and has been shown to metabolize to the latter, which plays a significant role in its effects.

== Synthesis ==
Synthesis: Patents:

PTC alkylation of piperazine (1) with 2 equivalents of piperonyl chloride [25054-53-9] (2) in the presence of cetrimonium bromide gives 1,4-bis-piperonylpiperazine [55436-41-4] (3). Base catalyzed treatment with 4-Chlorophenoxyacetic acid (4) displaces one of the piperonyl groups to give fipexide (5).

== See also ==
- Substituted piperazine
- Befuraline
- Piberaline
