= C25H26O3 =

The molecular formula C_{25}H_{26}O_{3} (molar mass: 374.48 g/mol, exact mass: 374.1882 u) may refer to:

- Adarotene
- Estrone benzoate, or estrone 3-benzoate
