= C17H14N2O3 =

The molecular formula C_{17}H_{14}N_{2}O_{3} (molar mass: 294.30 g/mol, exact mass: 294.1004 u) may refer to:

- Adosopine
- PHCCC
- Rosoxacin
