= CpG =

CpG may refer to:

- CpG site - methylated sequences of DNA significant in gene regulation
- CpG island - regions of DNA that contain several CpG sites
- CpG oligodeoxynucleotide - unmethylated sequences of DNA that have immunostimulatory properties
