= C9H10Cl2N4 =

The molecular formula C_{9}H_{10}Cl_{2}N_{4} (molar mass: 245.10 g/mol, exact mass: 244.0283 u) may refer to:

- Aganodine
- Apraclonidine
