= PCPA =

PCPA may refer to:

== Science ==
- para-Chlorophenylalanine (fenclonine), a synthetic amino acid
- Premature cleavage and polyadenylation
- para-Chlorophenoxyacetate (pCPA), a pesticide

== Other ==
- Pacific Conservatory of the Performing Arts, a school in Santa Maria, California, United States
- Poor Clares of Perpetual Adoration, an order of nuns in the Franciscan tradition
- Portland Center for the Performing Arts, in Portland, Oregon, United States
