= Pyritinol =

Chemical compound

Clinical data
- ATC code: N06BX02 (WHO)

Pharmacokinetic data
- Elimination half-life: 2.5 hours

Identifiers
- IUPAC name: 5,5'-[dithiobis(methylene)]bis[4-(hydroxymethyl)-2-methylpyridin-3-ol]
- CAS Number: 1098-97-1
- PubChem CID: 14190
- ChemSpider: 13561
- UNII: AK5Q5FZH2R
- KEGG: D02160
- ChEMBL: ChEMBL488093
- CompTox Dashboard (EPA): DTXSID3048362
- ECHA InfoCard: 100.012.864

Chemical and physical data
- Formula: C_{16}H_{20}N_{2}O_{4}S_{2}
- Molar mass: 368.47 g·mol^{−1}
- 3D model (JSmol): Interactive image
- SMILES: Oc1c(c(cnc1C)CSSCc2c(c(O)c(nc2)C)CO)CO
- InChI: InChI=1S/C16H20N2O4S2/c1-9-15(21)13(5-19)11(3-17-9)7-23-24-8-12-4-18-10(2)16(22)14(12)6-20/h3-4,19-22H,5-8H2,1-2H3; Key:SIXLXDIJGIWWFU-UHFFFAOYSA-N

Pyritinol also called pyridoxine disulfide or pyrithioxine (European drug names Encephabol, Encefabol, Cerbon 6) is a semi-synthetic water-soluble analog of vitamin B_{6} (Pyridoxine HCl). It was produced in 1961 by Merck Laboratories by bonding 2 vitamin B_{6} compounds (pyridoxine) together with a disulfide bridge. Since the 1970s, it has been a prescription and OTC drug in several countries for cognitive disorders, rheumatoid arthritis, and learning disorders in children. Since the early 1990s it has been sold as a nootropic dietary supplement in the United States.

== Availability ==
It is approved for "symptomatic treatment of chronically impaired brain function in dementia syndromes" and for "supportive treatment of sequelae of craniocerebral trauma" in various European countries, including Austria, Germany, France, Italy, Portugal, and Greece. In France it is also approved for rheumatoid arthritis as a disease modifying drug, on the basis of the results of clinical trials. In many countries it is available over the counter and is widely advertised on the internet as being for "memory disturbances."

== Adverse effects ==
Adverse effects include nausea, headache, and rarely allergic reaction (mild skin reactions). A 2004 survey of six case reports suggested a link between pyritinol and severe cholestatic hepatitis when on several drugs for certain diseases.

Other rare side effects: acute pancreatitis and photoallergic eruption.

== See also ==
- Emoxypine
- Pirisudanol
- Sulbutiamine
