= Piberaline =

Chemical compound

Clinical data
- Trade names: Trelibet
- ATC code: none

Identifiers
- IUPAC name: [4-(Phenylmethyl)piperazin-1-yl]-pyridin-2-ylmethanone
- CAS Number: 39640-15-8
- PubChem CID: 65975
- DrugBank: DB20339
- ChemSpider: 59374
- UNII: 8M09P36809
- CompTox Dashboard (EPA): DTXSID40192751

Chemical and physical data
- Formula: C_{17}H_{19}N_{3}O
- Molar mass: 281.359 g·mol^{−1}
- 3D model (JSmol): Interactive image
- SMILES: C1CN(CCN1CC2=CC=CC=C2)C(=O)C3=CC=CC=N3
- InChI: InChI=1S/C17H19N3O/c21-17(16-8-4-5-9-18-16)20-12-10-19(11-13-20)14-15-6-2-1-3-7-15/h1-9H,10-14H2; Key:TZFUBYYADABEAV-UHFFFAOYSA-N

Piberaline (EGYT-475; Trelibet) is a psychoactive drug and member of the piperazine chemical class which was developed in the 1980s. It has stimulant and antidepressant effects which are thought to be due largely to its active metabolite benzylpiperazine. It was studied to a limited extent in Hungary and Spain, but was not widely accepted and does not seem to be in current use, although a closely related drug befuraline with similar effects has been slightly more successful.

== Synthesis ==
Piberaline can be prepared by reaction of picolinic acid with benzylpiperazine.

Synthesis of piberaline

Alternatively, it can be synthesized from 2-chloropyridine, carbon monoxide, and benzylpiperazine.

== See also ==
- Substituted piperazine
- Befuraline
- Fipexide
