= Oxitriptan =

OTC medication for depression

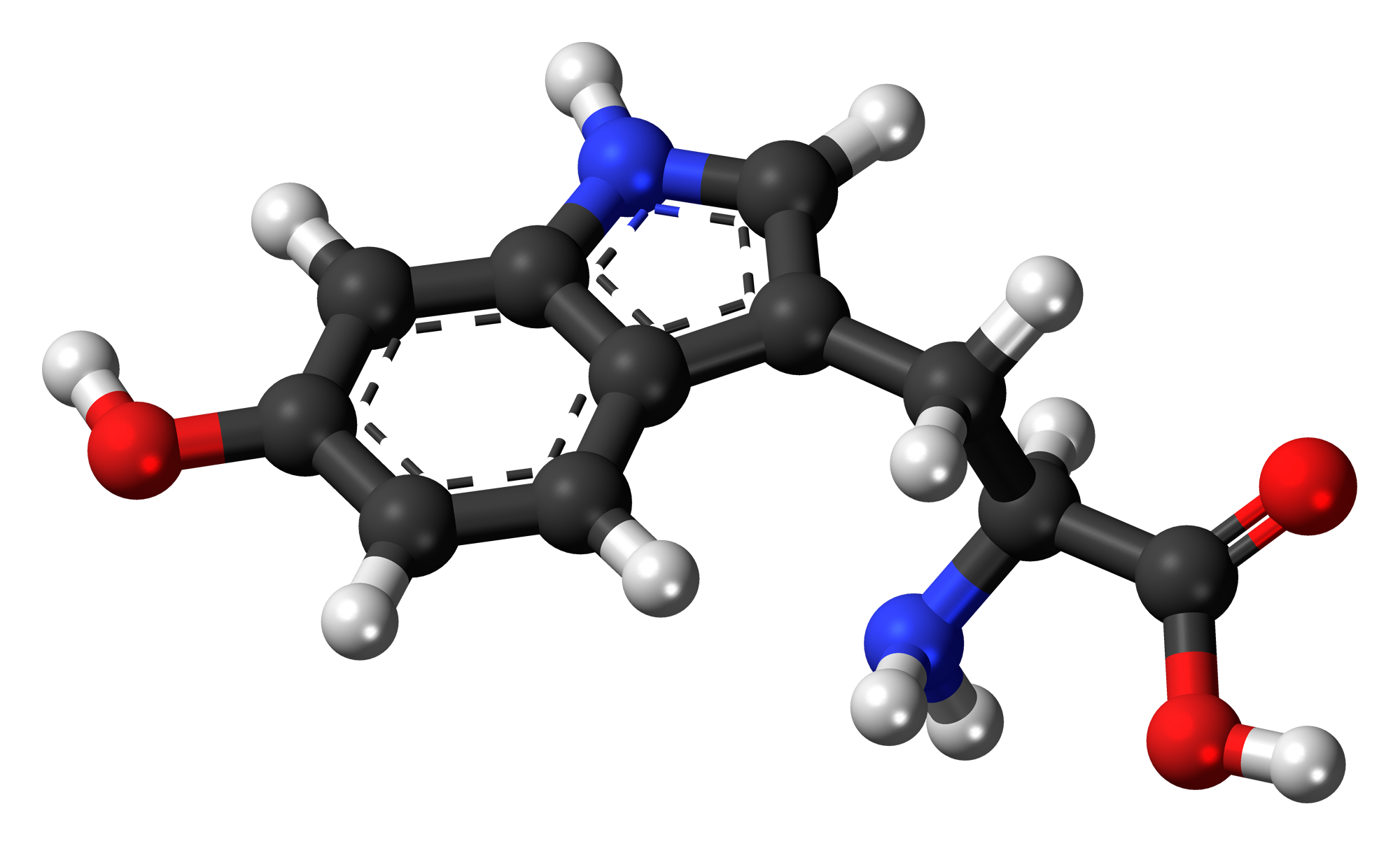

Clinical data
- Trade names: Cincofarm, Levothym, Levotonine, Oxyfan, Serovit, Telesol, Trimag, Tript-OH, Triptum
- Other names: Oxytryptan; 5-Hydroxytryptophan; L-5-Hydroxytryptophan; 5-Hydroxy-L-tryptophan; L-5-HTP; 5-HTP; α-Carboxy-5-hydroxytryptamine; α-Carboxy-5-HT
- Routes of administration: Oral
- Drug class: Serotonin precursor; Serotonin receptor agonist
- ATC code: N06AX01 (WHO)

Pharmacokinetic data
- Bioavailability: 49 ± 19% With carbidopa: up to 84%
- Metabolism: Decarboxylation
- Metabolites: • Serotonin
- Elimination half-life: Oral: 4.4–7 hours IV: 2.2–7.4 hours

Identifiers
- IUPAC name: (2S)-2-amino-3-(5-hydroxy-1H-indol-3-yl)propanoic acid
- CAS Number: 4350-09-8
- PubChem CID: 439280
- IUPHAR/BPS: 4671
- DrugBank: DB02959
- ChemSpider: 388413
- UNII: C1LJO185Q9
- KEGG: D07339
- ChEBI: CHEBI:17780
- ChEMBL: ChEMBL350221

Chemical and physical data
- Formula: C_{11}H_{12}N_{2}O_{3}
- Molar mass: 220.228 g·mol^{−1}
- 3D model (JSmol): Interactive image
- SMILES: C1=CC2=C(C=C1O)C(=CN2)C[C@@H](C(=O)O)N
- InChI: InChI=1S/C11H12N2O3/c12-9(11(15)16)3-6-5-13-10-2-1-7(14)4-8(6)10/h1-2,4-5,9,13-14H,3,12H2,(H,15,16)/t9-/m0/s1; Key:LDCYZAJDBXYCGN-VIFPVBQESA-N

Oxitriptan, also known as L-5-hydroxytryptophan (5-HTP) and sold under various brand names, is a medication and over-the-counter dietary supplement used in the treatment of depression and for other indications. It is taken by mouth.

Side effects of oxitriptan include appetite loss, nausea, diarrhea, vomiting, and serotonin syndrome. The drug is a centrally permeable monoamine precursor and prodrug of serotonin and hence acts as a serotonin receptor agonist. Chemically, oxitriptan is an amino acid and a tryptamine.

Oxitriptan has been used clinically since at least the 1970s.

== Uses ==
=== Medical ===
5-HTP is sold over-the-counter in the United States, France, Canada, Singapore, the Netherlands, and the United Kingdom as a dietary supplement for use as an antidepressant, appetite suppressant, and sleep aid. It is also marketed in many European countries for the indication of major depressive disorder under the trade names Cincofarm, Levothym, Levotonine, Oxyfan, Telesol, Tript-OH, and Triptum.

A 2002 review concluded that although the data evaluated suggests that 5-HTP is more effective than placebo in the treatment of depression, the evidence was insufficient to be conclusive due to a lack of clinical data meeting the rigorous standards of the day. More and larger studies using current methodologies are needed to determine if 5-HTP is truly effective in treating depression. In small, controlled trials, 5-HTP has also been reported to augment the antidepressant efficacy of the antidepressant clomipramine. A 2020 meta-analysis found oral 5-HTP supplementation had a large effect size on depression symptom severity. However, the included studies were considered relatively weak and the methods and treatment duration varied between the seven studies examined.

==== Other uses ====
At high doses, or in combination with carbidopa, 5-HTP has been used to treat obesity (by promoting weight loss).

=== Use after MDMA ===
MDMA is an empathogenic-entactogenic and serotonergic psychotropic drug used primarily for recreational, though sometimes also therapeutic, purposes. Among users of MDMA, the serotonergic effects of the drug are often of particular interest and concern: After consuming MDMA, serotonin concentrations are greatly reduced in the brain. 5-HTP is necessary for serotonin production and its concentrations in the brain also decrease after taking MDMA.

== Side effects ==
Potential side effects of 5-HTP include heartburn, abdominal pain, nausea, vomiting, diarrhea, drowsiness, sexual problems, vivid dreams or nightmares, and muscle problems. Serotonin syndrome can occur.

Because 5-HTP has not been thoroughly studied in a clinical setting, possible side effects and interactions with other drugs are not well known. According to the US National Library of Medicine, 5-HTP has not been associated with serotonin syndrome or any serious adverse events in humans. Across multiple studies, 5-HTP has also been reported to not cause any noticeable hematological or cardiovascular changes. 5-HTP had also been associated with eosinophilia, but later studies have not found any causal connection.

== Interactions ==
When combined with antidepressants of the MAOI or SSRI class, very high parenteral doses of 5-HTP can cause acute serotonin syndrome in rats. It is unclear if such findings have clinical relevance, as most drugs will cause serious adverse events or death in rodents at very high doses. In humans, 5-HTP has never been clinically associated with serotonin syndrome – although a case report suggests 5-HTP can precipitate mania when added to an MAOI.

When combined with carbidopa (as a treatment for symptoms of Parkinson's disease), 5-HTP causes nausea and vomiting; however, this can be alleviated via administration of granisetron. Cases of scleroderma-like illness have been reported in patients using carbidopa and 5-HTP.

Oral 5-HTP results in an increase in urinary 5-HIAA, a serotonin metabolite, indicating that 5-HTP is peripherally metabolized to serotonin, which is then metabolized. This might cause false positive results in tests looking for carcinoid syndrome. Due to the conversion of 5-HTP into serotonin by the liver, there could be a risk of heart valve disease from serotonin's effect on the heart, as based on preclinical findings. However, 5-HTP has not been associated with cardiac toxicity in humans.

It has been suggested that 5-HTP may cause eosinophilia-myalgia syndrome (EMS), a serious condition which results in extreme muscle tenderness, myalgia, and blood abnormalities. However, there is evidence to show that EMS was likely caused by a contaminant in certain 5-HTP supplements.

== Pharmacology ==
The psychoactive action of 5-HTP is derived from its increase in production of serotonin in central nervous system tissue.

Metabolic pathway from tryptophan to serotonin.

Research shows that co-administration with carbidopa greatly increases plasma 5-HTP levels. Other studies have indicated the risk of a scleroderma-like condition resulting from the combination of 5-HTP and carbidopa.

After oral administration, 5-HTP is absorbed by the upper intestine. The mode of absorption is not known, but presumably involves active transport via amino acid transporters. 5-HTP is adequately absorbed via oral cavity. With a decarboxylase inhibitor, the bioavailability of 5-HTP can be higher than 50%.

5-HTP is rapidly absorbed with a t_{max} of ≈1.5 h, and rapidly eliminated with a half-life of ≈1.5 – 2 h. Co-administration of a decarboxylase inhibitor (e.g., carbidopa, benserazide) doubles the half-life of 5-HTP to ≈ 3 – 4 h, and enhances exposure several-fold, depending on the dosing regimen.

5-HTP's short half-life (<2 hours) may inherently limit its therapeutic potential, as systemic 5-HTP exposure levels will fluctuate substantially even with relatively frequent dosing. Such exposure fluctuations are usually associated with increased adverse event burdens resulting from C_{max} (time to maximal systemic concentration) drug spikes, and decreased clinical efficacy resulting from sub-therapeutic exposure for large parts of the day, when taken as a single dose unit or at intervals significantly larger than C_{max}. It has been proposed that 5-HTP dosage forms achieving prolonged delivery would be more effective, as has been demonstrated many times with other pharmaceuticals with short durations of action. For example, controlled-release oxycodone (OxyContin) or morphine (MS-Contin) are intended to, via novel delivery mechanisms, permit pain relief for up to twelve hours with an active ingredient which only provides relief for 3 to 6 hours. However, the inherent variability amongst different people with respect to drug metabolism makes this task challenging.

== Society and culture ==
=== Names ===
Oxitriptan is the generic name of the drug and its INN. Brand names of oxitriptan include Cincofarm, Levothym, Levotonine, Oxyfan, Telesol, Tript-OH, and Triptum.

=== Regulatory status ===
There are currently no approved drug products containing 5-HTP approved by the FDA. All available 5-HTP products are nutraceuticals and are as such not regulated or verified for purity, integrity, or clinical efficacy or safety, mandating caution regarding human consumption.

As of 25 August 2020, Hungary added 5-HTP to the controlled psychoactive substances list, prohibiting production, sale, import, storage and use, becoming the first country to do so.

=== Natural sources ===
The seeds of the Griffonia simplicifolia, a climbing shrub native to West Africa and Central Africa, are used as an herbal supplement for their 5-HTP content. In one 2010 trial, Griffonia simplicifolia extract appeared to increase satiety in overweight women.

== Research ==
In clinical trials of various design, 5-HTP has also been reported to treat fibromyalgia, myoclonus, migraine, and cerebellar ataxia. However, these clinical findings, as for all therapeutic findings with 5-HTP, are preliminary and need confirmation in larger trials.

=== Oxitriptan/carbidopa combination ===
A combination of oxitriptan and carbidopa, oxitriptan/carbidopa, is being developed for the potential treatment of depression.

=== Slow-release formulation ===
5-HTP's short half-life is impractical for chronic drug therapy. Research conducted at Duke University in mice has demonstrated that 5-HTP when administered as slow-release appears to gain drug properties. Slow-release delivery attenuates or abolishes the peaks and valleys in 5-HTP exposure during treatment. Slow-release delivery of 5-HTP markedly improved the safety profile of 5-HTP and conferred stable plasma exposure of 5-HTP and strong and sustained enhancement of brain serotonin function. This discovery indicates that 5-HTP slow-release medications represent a new avenue for treatment of brain disorders responsive to serotonergic enhancement.

== See also ==
- Tryptophan
- α-Methyl-5-hydroxytryptophan
