= Befuraline =

Psychoactive drug of the piperazine chemical class

Clinical data
- ATC code: none

Identifiers
- IUPAC name: 1-benzofuran-2-yl(4-benzylpiperazin-1-yl)methanone
- CAS Number: 41717-30-0 41716-84-1
- PubChem CID: 68664
- ChemSpider: 61918
- UNII: 787AQ35GHR
- ChEMBL: ChEMBL1076256
- CompTox Dashboard (EPA): DTXSID2046206

Chemical and physical data
- Formula: C_{20}H_{20}N_{2}O_{2}
- Molar mass: 320.392 g·mol^{−1}
- 3D model (JSmol): Interactive image
- SMILES: O=C(N1CCN(CC1)CC2=CC=CC=C2)C3=CC4=C(C=CC=C4)O3
- InChI: InChI=1S/C20H20N2O2/c23-20(19-14-17-8-4-5-9-18(17)24-19)22-12-10-21(11-13-22)15-16-6-2-1-3-7-16/h1-9,14H,10-13,15H2; Key:SRIJFPBZWUFLFD-UHFFFAOYSA-N

Befuraline (DIV-154) is a psychoactive drug and member of the piperazine chemical class which was developed in Germany in the 1970s. Befuraline has stimulant and antidepressant effects and has seen some use in Germany and France, although it has never become widely used. Befuraline's active metabolite benzylpiperazine is likely to contribute to its effects.

== Synthesis ==
Synthesis: Patent:

A one-step coupling between coumarilic acid (benzofuran-2-carboxylic acid) [496-41-3] (1) and benzylpiperazine (BzP) (2) gives an amide, and hence Befuraline (3).

== See also ==
- Substituted piperazine
- Fipexide
- Piberaline
