= Agatolimod =

Identifiers
CAS Number	207623-20-9
3D model (JSmol)	Interactive image
ChemSpider	48284824
PubChem CID	56841789
UNII	5V336PV3HG
- InChI: InChI=1S/C236H303N70O133P23S23/c1-91-47-287(223(333)269-193(91)309)157-23-105(308)130(394-157)62-370-440(347,463)422-111-29-163(289-49-93(3)195(311)271-225(289)335)399-135(111)67-381-457(364,480)434-123-41-175(301-85-247-181-187(301)257-213(241)263-207(181)323)412-148(123)80-388-443(350,466)419-108-26-159(284-20-16-154(238)254-220(284)330)396-132(108)64-373-447(354,470)424-113-31-165(291-51-95(5)197(313)273-227(291)337)407-143(113)75-383-461(368,484)438-127-45-179(305-89-251-185-191(305)261-217(245)267-211(185)327)415-151(127)83-391-455(362,478)432-121-39-173(299-59-103(13)205(321)281-235(299)345)404-140(121)72-379-451(358,474)428-117-35-169(295-55-99(9)201(317)277-231(295)341)400-136(117)68-376-450(357,473)427-116-34-168(294-54-98(8)200(316)276-230(294)340)403-139(116)71-378-454(361,477)431-120-38-172(298-58-102(12)204(320)280-234(298)344)410-146(120)78-386-460(367,483)437-126-44-178(304-88-250-184-190(304)260-216(244)266-210(184)326)414-150(126)82-390-445(352,468)421-110-28-161(286-22-18-156(240)256-222(286)332)398-134(110)66-374-448(355,471)425-114-32-166(292-52-96(6)198(314)274-228(292)338)408-144(114)76-384-462(369,485)439-128-46-180(306-90-252-186-192(306)262-218(246)268-212(186)328)416-152(128)84-392-456(363,479)433-122-40-174(300-60-104(14)206(322)282-236(300)346)405-141(122)73-380-452(359,475)429-118-36-170(296-56-100(10)202(318)278-232(296)342)401-137(118)69-375-449(356,472)426-115-33-167(293-53-97(7)199(315)275-229(293)339)402-138(115)70-377-453(360,476)430-119-37-171(297-57-101(11)203(319)279-233(297)343)409-145(119)77-385-459(366,482)436-125-43-177(303-87-249-183-189(303)259-215(243)265-209(183)325)413-149(125)81-389-444(351,467)420-109-27-160(285-21-17-155(239)255-221(285)331)397-133(109)65-372-446(353,469)423-112-30-164(290-50-94(4)196(312)272-226(290)336)406-142(112)74-382-458(365,481)435-124-42-176(302-86-248-182-188(302)258-214(242)264-208(182)324)411-147(124)79-387-442(349,465)418-107-25-158(283-19-15-153(237)253-219(283)329)395-131(107)63-371-441(348,464)417-106-24-162(393-129(106)61-307)288-48-92(2)194(310)270-224(288)334/h15-22,47-60,85-90,105-152,157-180,307-308H,23-46,61-84H2,1-14H3,(H,347,463)(H,348,464)(H,349,465)(H,350,466)(H,351,467)(H,352,468)(H,353,469)(H,354,470)(H,355,471)(H,356,472)(H,357,473)(H,358,474)(H,359,475)(H,360,476)(H,361,477)(H,362,478)(H,363,479)(H,364,480)(H,365,481)(H,366,482)(H,367,483)(H,368,484)(H,369,485)(H2,237,253,329)(H2,238,254,330)(H2,239,255,331)(H2,240,256,332)(H,269,309,333)(H,270,310,334)(H,271,311,335)(H,272,312,336)(H,273,313,337)(H,274,314,338)(H,275,315,339)(H,276,316,340)(H,277,317,341)(H,278,318,342)(H,279,319,343)(H,280,320,344)(H,281,321,345)(H,282,322,346)(H3,241,257,263,323)(H3,242,258,264,324)(H3,243,259,265,325)(H3,244,260,266,326)(H3,245,261,267,327)(H3,246,262,268,328)/t105-,106-,107-,108-,109-,110-,111-,112-,113-,114-,115-,116-,117-,118-,119-,120-,121-,122-,123-,124-,125-,126-,127-,128-,129+,130+,131+,132+,133+,134+,135+,136+,137+,138+,139+,140+,141+,142+,143+,144+,145+,146+,147+,148+,149+,150+,151+,152+,157+,158+,159+,160+,161+,162+,163+,164+,165+,166+,167+,168+,169+,170+,171+,172+,173+,174+,175+,176+,177+,178+,179+,180+,440?,441?,442?,443?,444?,445?,446?,447?,448?,449?,450?,451?,452?,453?,454?,455?,456?,457?,458?,459?,460?,461?,462?/m0/s1 Key: KQQWAOVVQRSHRC-CPSXWDTOSA-N; InChI=1/C236H303N70O133P23S23/c1-91-47-287(223(333)269-193(91)309)157-23-105(308)130(394-157)62-370-440(347,463)422-111-29-163(289-49-93(3)195(311)271-225(289)335)399-135(111)67-381-457(364,480)434-123-41-175(301-85-247-181-187(301)257-213(241)263-207(181)323)412-148(123)80-388-443(350,466)419-108-26-159(284-20-16-154(238)254-220(284)330)396-132(108)64-373-447(354,470)424-113-31-165(291-51-95(5)197(313)273-227(291)337)407-143(113)75-383-461(368,484)438-127-45-179(305-89-251-185-191(305)261-217(245)267-211(185)327)415-151(127)83-391-455(362,478)432-121-39-173(299-59-103(13)205(321)281-235(299)345)404-140(121)72-379-451(358,474)428-117-35-169(295-55-99(9)201(317)277-231(295)341)400-136(117)68-376-450(357,473)427-116-34-168(294-54-98(8)200(316)276-230(294)340)403-139(116)71-378-454(361,477)431-120-38-172(298-58-102(12)204(320)280-234(298)344)410-146(120)78-386-460(367,483)437-126-44-178(304-88-250-184-190(304)260-216(244)266-210(184)326)414-150(126)82-390-445(352,468)421-110-28-161(286-22-18-156(240)256-222(286)332)398-134(110)66-374-448(355,471)425-114-32-166(292-52-96(6)198(314)274-228(292)338)408-144(114)76-384-462(369,485)439-128-46-180(306-90-252-186-192(306)262-218(246)268-212(186)328)416-152(128)84-392-456(363,479)433-122-40-174(300-60-104(14)206(322)282-236(300)346)405-141(122)73-380-452(359,475)429-118-36-170(296-56-100(10)202(318)278-232(296)342)401-137(118)69-375-449(356,472)426-115-33-167(293-53-97(7)199(315)275-229(293)339)402-138(115)70-377-453(360,476)430-119-37-171(297-57-101(11)203(319)279-233(297)343)409-145(119)77-385-459(366,482)436-125-43-177(303-87-249-183-189(303)259-215(243)265-209(183)325)413-149(125)81-389-444(351,467)420-109-27-160(285-21-17-155(239)255-221(285)331)397-133(109)65-372-446(353,469)423-112-30-164(290-50-94(4)196(312)272-226(290)336)406-142(112)74-382-458(365,481)435-124-42-176(302-86-248-182-188(302)258-214(242)264-208(182)324)411-147(124)79-387-442(349,465)418-107-25-158(283-19-15-153(237)253-219(283)329)395-131(107)63-371-441(348,464)417-106-24-162(393-129(106)61-307)288-48-92(2)194(310)270-224(288)334/h15-22,47-60,85-90,105-152,157-180,307-308H,23-46,61-84H2,1-14H3,(H,347,463)(H,348,464)(H,349,465)(H,350,466)(H,351,467)(H,352,468)(H,353,469)(H,354,470)(H,355,471)(H,356,472)(H,357,473)(H,358,474)(H,359,475)(H,360,476)(H,361,477)(H,362,478)(H,363,479)(H,364,480)(H,365,481)(H,366,482)(H,367,483)(H,368,484)(H,369,485)(H2,237,253,329)(H2,238,254,330)(H2,239,255,331)(H2,240,256,332)(H,269,309,333)(H,270,310,334)(H,271,311,335)(H,272,312,336)(H,273,313,337)(H,274,314,338)(H,275,315,339)(H,276,316,340)(H,277,317,341)(H,278,318,342)(H,279,319,343)(H,280,320,344)(H,281,321,345)(H,282,322,346)(H3,241,257,263,323)(H3,242,258,264,324)(H3,243,259,265,325)(H3,244,260,266,326)(H3,245,261,267,327)(H3,246,262,268,328)/t105-,106-,107-,108-,109-,110-,111-,112-,113-,114-,115-,116-,117-,118-,119-,120-,121-,122-,123-,124-,125-,126-,127-,128-,129+,130+,131+,132+,133+,134+,135+,136+,137+,138+,139+,140+,141+,142+,143+,144+,145+,146+,147+,148+,149+,150+,151+,152+,157+,158+,159+,160+,161+,162+,163+,164+,165+,166+,167+,168+,169+,170+,171+,172+,173+,174+,175+,176+,177+,178+,179+,180+,440?,441?,442?,443?,444?,445?,446?,447?,448?,449?,450?,451?,452?,453?,454?,455?,456?,457?,458?,459?,460?,461?,462?/m0/s1 Key: KQQWAOVVQRSHRC-CPSXWDTOBP
- SMILES: Cc1cn(c(=O)[nH]c1=O)[C@H]2C[C@@H]([C@H](O2)COP(=S)(O)O[C@H]3C[C@@H](O[C@@H]3COP(=S)(O)O[C@H]4C[C@@H](O[C@@H]4COP(=S)(O)O[C@H]5C[C@@H](O[C@@H]5COP(=S)(O)O[C@H]6C[C@@H](O[C@@H]6COP(=S)(O)O[C@H]7C[C@@H](O[C@@H]7COP(=S)(O)O[C@H]8C[C@@H](O[C@@H]8COP(=S)(O)O[C@H]9C[C@@H](O[C@@H]9COP(=S)(O)O[C@H]1C[C@@H](O[C@@H]1COP(=S)(O)O[C@H]1C[C@@H](O[C@@H]1COP(=S)(O)O[C@H]1C[C@@H](O[C@@H]1COP(=S)(O)O[C@H]1C[C@@H](O[C@@H]1COP(=S)(O)O[C@H]1C[C@@H](O[C@@H]1COP(=S)(O)O[C@H]1C[C@@H](O[C@@H]1COP(=S)(O)O[C@H]1C[C@@H](O[C@@H]1COP(=S)(O)O[C@H]1C[C@@H](O[C@@H]1COP(=S)(O)O[C@H]1C[C@@H](O[C@@H]1COP(=S)(O)O[C@H]1C[C@@H](O[C@@H]1COP(=S)(O)O[C@H]1C[C@@H](O[C@@H]1COP(=S)(O)O[C@H]1C[C@@H](O[C@@H]1COP(=S)(O)O[C@H]1C[C@@H](O[C@@H]1COP(=S)(O)O[C@H]1C[C@@H](O[C@@H]1COP(=S)(O)O[C@H]1C[C@@H](O[C@@H]1COP(=S)(O)O[C@H]1C[C@@H](O[C@@H]1CO)n1cc(c(=O)[nH]c1=O)C)n1ccc(nc1=O)N)n1cnc2c1nc([nH]c2=O)N)n1cc(c(=O)[nH]c1=O)C)n1ccc(nc1=O)N)n1cnc2c1nc([nH]c2=O)N)n1cc(c(=O)[nH]c1=O)C)n1cc(c(=O)[nH]c1=O)C)n1cc(c(=O)[nH]c1=O)C)n1cc(c(=O)[nH]c1=O)C)n1cnc2c1nc([nH]c2=O)N)n1cc(c(=O)[nH]c1=O)C)n1ccc(nc1=O)N)n1cnc2c1nc([nH]c2=O)N)n1cc(c(=O)[nH]c1=O)C)n1cc(c(=O)[nH]c1=O)C)n1cc(c(=O)[nH]c1=O)C)n1cc(c(=O)[nH]c1=O)C)n1cnc2c1nc([nH]c2=O)N)n1cc(c(=O)[nH]c1=O)C)n1ccc(nc1=O)N)n1cnc2c1nc([nH]c2=O)N)n1cc(c(=O)[nH]c1=O)C)O

Properties
Chemical formula	C_{236}H_{303}N_{70}O_{133}P_{23}S_{23}
Molar mass	7698.212
- Except where otherwise noted, data are given for materials in their standard state (at 25 °C [77 °F], 100 kPa). Infobox references

Agatolimod (also known as CpG 7909, ODN 2006, PF-3512676, VaxImmune, and ProMuneT) is a CpG Oligodeoxynucleotide which acts as a toll-like receptor 9 agonist. Agatolimod stimulates the immune system and has been tested for prevention and treatment of cancer, infectious diseases, allergies, and asthma.

== Sequence ==
Agatolimod is composed of 24 deoxyribonucleotides in the following sequence:

(T-C-G-T-C-G-T-T-T-T-G-T-C-G-T-T-T-T-G-T-C-G-T-T)
