= Memantine/donepezil =

Medication

Combination of
- Memantine: NMDA receptor antagonist
- Donepezil: Acetylcholinesterase inhibitor

Clinical data
- Trade names: Namzaric
- AHFS/Drugs.com: Micromedex Detailed Consumer Information
- License data: US DailyMed: Memantine and donepezil
- Routes of administration: By mouth
- ATC code: N06DA52 (WHO)

Legal status
- Legal status: US: ℞-only; Rx-only

Identifiers
- KEGG: D11387

Memantine/donepezil, sold under the brand name Namzaric among others, is a fixed dose combination medication used for the treatment of dementia of the Alzheimer's type. It contains memantine hydrochloride (it acts as an NMDA receptor antagonist, among various other types of targets like 5-HT3 receptor, Nicotinic acetylcholine receptor, and Sigma-1 receptor) and donepezil hydrochloride, which is an acetylcholinesterase inhibitor. It is taken by mouth.

Memantine/donepezil was approved for medical use in the United States in 2014.
