= Duocarmycin =

The duocarmycins are members of a series of related natural products first isolated from Streptomyces bacteria in 1978. They are notable for their extreme cytotoxicity and thus represent a class of exceptionally potent antitumour antibiotics.

== Biological activity ==
As small-molecule, synthetic, DNA minor groove binding alkylating agents, duocarmycins are suitable to target solid tumors. They bind to the minor groove of DNA and alkylate the nucleobase adenine at the N3 position. The irreversible alkylation of DNA disrupts the nucleic acid architecture, which eventually leads to tumor cell death. Analogues of naturally occurring antitumour agents, such as duocarmycins, represent a new class of highly potent antineoplastic compounds.

The work of Dale L. Boger and others created a better understanding of the pharmacophore and mechanism of action of the duocarmycins. This research has led to synthetic analogs including adozelesin, bizelesin, and carzelesin which progressed into clinical trials for the treatment of cancer. Similar research that Boger utilized for comparison to his results involving elimination of cancerous tumors and antigens was centered around the use of similar immunoconjugates that were introduced to cancerous colon cells. These studies related to Boger's research involving antigen-specificity that is necessary to the success of the duocarmycins as antitumor treatments.

== Duocarmycin analogues vs tubulin binders ==
The duocarmycin have shown activity in a variety of multi-drug resistant (MDR) models. Agents that are part of this class of duocarmycins have the potency in the low picomolar range. This makes them suitable for maximizing the cell-killing potency of antibody-drug conjugates to which they are attached.

== Duocarmycins ==
Duocarmycin A

Duocarmycin B1

Duocarmycin B2

Duocarmycin C1

Duocarmycin C2

Duocarmycin D

Duocarmycin SA

CC-1065

== Antibody-drug conjugates ==
The DNA modifying agents such as duocarmycin are being used in the development of antibody-drug conjugate or ADCs. Scientists at The Netherlands-based Byondis (formerly Synthon) have combined a unique linkers with duocarmycin derivatives that have a hydroxyl group which is crucial for biological activity. Using this technology scientists aim to create ADCs having an optimal therapeutic window, balancing the effect of potent cell-killing agents on tumor cells versus healthy cells.

== Synthetic analogs ==
The synthetic analogs of duocarmycins include adozelesin, bizelesin, and carzelesin. As members of the cyclopropylpyrroloindole family, these investigational drugs have progressed into clinical trials for the treatment of cancer.

=== Bizelesin ===
Bizelesin

Bizelesin is antineoplastic antibiotic which binds to the minor groove of DNA and induces interstrand cross-linking of DNA, thereby inhibiting DNA replication and RNA synthesis. Bizelesin also enhances p53 and p21 induction and triggers G2/M cell-cycle arrest, resulting in cell senescence without apoptosis.

Adozelesin

Carzelesin
