= Pirisudanol =

Chemical compound

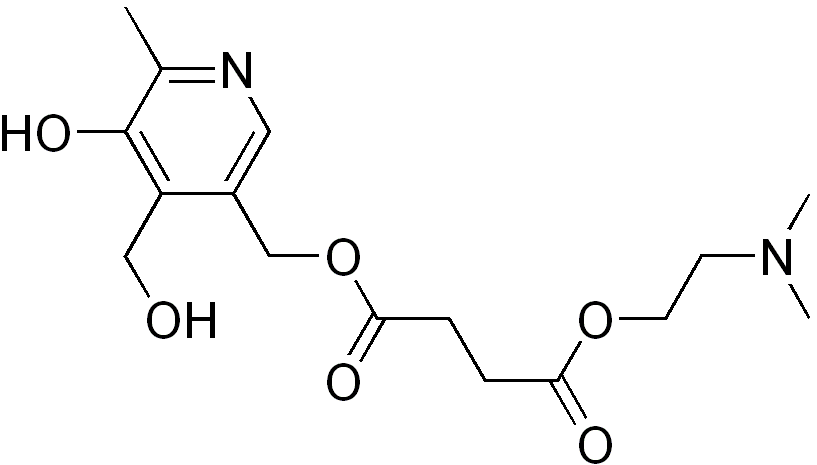

Clinical data
- AHFS/Drugs.com: International Drug Names
- Routes of administration: Oral
- ATC code: N06BX08 (WHO)

Legal status
- Legal status: In general: ℞ (Prescription only)

Identifiers
- IUPAC name: 2-(dimethylamino)ethyl[5-hydroxy-4-(hydroxymethyl)-6-methyl-3-pyridinyl]methylbutanedioate
- CAS Number: 33605-94-6
- PubChem CID: 65782
- ChemSpider: 59202
- UNII: W618Z2SMVL
- KEGG: D07347
- CompTox Dashboard (EPA): DTXSID60187301
- ECHA InfoCard: 100.046.887

Chemical and physical data
- Formula: C_{16}H_{24}N_{2}O_{6}
- Molar mass: 340.376 g·mol^{−1}
- 3D model (JSmol): Interactive image
- SMILES: CC1=NC=C(C(=C1O)CO)COC(=O)CCC(=O)OCCN(C)C
- InChI: InChI=1S/C16H24N2O6/c1-11-16(22)13(9-19)12(8-17-11)10-24-15(21)5-4-14(20)23-7-6-18(2)3/h8,19,22H,4-7,9-10H2,1-3H3; Key:KTOAWCPDBUCJED-UHFFFAOYSA-N

Pirisudanol (Mentis, Menthen, Mentium, Nadex, Nadexen, Nadexon, Pridana, Stivane), also known as pyrisuccideanol, is the succinic acid ester of pyridoxine (a form of vitamin B_{6}) and of deanol (DMAE). It has been used in Europe in the treatment of mild cognitive impairment as well as fatigue and depression.

== Synthesis ==
Pirisudanol is synthesized by the following method:

Cyclic ketal formation between pyridoxine [33605-94-6] HCl: [58-56-0] (1) and acetone resulted in alpha4,3-O-Isopropylidene Pyridoxine [1136-52-3] (2). In the other arm of the synthesis succinic anhydride [108-30-5] (3) is then esterified with Deanol [108-01-0] (4) gives Yakton [10549-59-4] (5). Halogenation of the remaining carboxyl group with thionyl chloride gives PC135056269 (6). In a convergent synthesis, esterification between 2 and 6 gives 7. The last step consists of deblocking the protecting group by hydrolysis with 1% formic acid in ethanol to give the product (8).

== Analytical data ==
(uv, ir, pmr, ms):

== See also ==
- Pyritinol
