= Toll-like receptor 9 =

Protein found in humans

TLR9

Identifiers
- Aliases: TLR9, CD289, toll like receptor 9
- External IDs: OMIM: 605474; MGI: 1932389; GeneCards: TLR9

Gene location (Human)
Chr.	Chromosome 3 (human)
Band	3p21.2	Start	52,221,080 bp
Band	3p21.2	End	52,225,645 bp

Gene location (Mouse)
Chr.	Chromosome 9 (mouse)
Band	9|9 F1	Start	106,099,797 bp
Band	9|9 F1	End	106,104,082 bp
RNA expression pattern
Bgee	Human / Mouse (ortholog); Top expressed in: blood; granulocyte; lymph node; bone marrow cell; spleen; monocyte; cerebellar hemisphere; right hemisphere of cerebellum; gastrocnemius muscle; skeletal muscle tissue / Top expressed in: zygote; gastrula; secondary oocyte; morula; granulocyte; sternocleidomastoid muscle; spleen; digastric muscle; temporal muscle; thymus; More reference expression data
BioGPS	n/a
Gene ontology
Molecular function	siRNA binding; interleukin-1 receptor binding; transmembrane signaling receptor activity; 1-phosphatidylinositol-3-kinase activity; protein homodimerization activity; unmethylated CpG binding; pattern recognition receptor activity
Cellular component	cytoplasm; integral component of membrane; endosome; endoplasmic reticulum membrane; membrane; early phagosome; Golgi membrane; plasma membrane; extracellular region; basolateral plasma membrane; apical plasma membrane; endoplasmic reticulum; phagocytic vesicle; endolysosome membrane; lysosome; endosome membrane; cytoplasmic vesicle; extracellular space; endolysosome
Biological process	positive regulation of interleukin-18 production; positive regulation of toll-like receptor signaling pathway; positive regulation of inflammatory response; positive regulation of interleukin-12 production; axonogenesis; positive regulation of interleukin-10 production; immune system process; positive regulation of JUN kinase activity; negative regulation of interleukin-6 production; I-kappaB phosphorylation; positive regulation of JNK cascade; positive regulation of nitric-oxide synthase biosynthetic process; MyD88-dependent toll-like receptor signaling pathway; negative regulation of interleukin-8 production; positive regulation of gene expression; negative regulation of ATPase-coupled calcium transmembrane transporter activity; negative regulation of toll-like receptor signaling pathway; defense response to bacterium; maintenance of gastrointestinal epithelium; positive regulation of granulocyte macrophage colony-stimulating factor production; positive regulation of NF-kappaB transcription factor activity; positive regulation of interleukin-8 production; positive regulation of interleukin-6 production; positive regulation of tumor necrosis factor production; positive regulation of I-kappaB kinase/NF-kappaB signaling; positive regulation of chemokine production; tumor necrosis factor production; toll-like receptor 9 signaling pathway; innate immune response; inflammatory response; response to molecule of bacterial origin; negative regulation of NF-kappaB transcription factor activity; positive regulation of transcription by RNA polymerase II; signal transduction; positive regulation of interferon-beta production; toll-like receptor signaling pathway; phosphatidylinositol-3-phosphate biosynthetic process; positive regulation of immunoglobulin production; positive regulation of B cell proliferation; regulation of toll-like receptor 9 signaling pathway; positive regulation of MAPK cascade; regulation of B cell differentiation; positive regulation of B cell activation; positive regulation of NIK/NF-kappaB signaling; immune response; I-kappaB kinase/NF-kappaB signaling; defense response to virus
Sources:Amigo / QuickGO
Orthologs
Databases	NCBI: entry; OMA: entry
Species	Human	Mouse
Entrez	54106	81897
Ensembl	ENSG00000239732	ENSMUSG00000045322
UniProt	Q9NR96	Q9EQU3
RefSeq (mRNA)	NM_138688; NM_017442	NM_031178
RefSeq (protein)	NP_059138	NP_112455
Location (UCSC)	Chr 3: 52.22 – 52.23 Mb	Chr 9: 106.1 – 106.1 Mb
PubMed search
- Wikidata
View/Edit Human	View/Edit Mouse

Toll-like receptor 9 is a protein that in humans is encoded by the TLR9 gene. TLR9 has also been designated as CD289 (cluster of differentiation 289). It is a member of the toll-like receptor (TLR) family. TLR9 is an important receptor expressed in immune system cells including dendritic cells, macrophages, natural killer cells, and other antigen presenting cells. TLR9 is expressed on endosomes internalized from the plasma membrane, binds DNA (preferentially DNA containing unmethylated CpGs of bacterial or viral origin), and triggers signaling cascades that lead to a pro-inflammatory cytokine response. Cancer, infection, and tissue damage can all modulate TLR9 expression and activation. TLR9 is also an important factor in autoimmune diseases, and there is active research into synthetic TLR9 agonists and antagonists that help regulate autoimmune inflammation.

== Function ==
The TLR family plays a fundamental role in pathogen recognition and activation of innate immunity. TLRs are named for the high degree of conservation in structure and function seen between mammalian TLRs and the Drosophila transmembrane protein Toll. TLRs are transmembrane proteins, expressed on the cell surface and the endocytic compartment and recognize pathogen-associated molecular patterns (PAMPs) that are expressed on infectious agents and initiate signaling to induce production of cytokines necessary for the innate immunity and subsequent adaptive immunity. The various TLRs exhibit different patterns of expression.

This gene is preferentially expressed in immune cell rich tissues, such as spleen, lymph node, bone marrow and peripheral blood leukocytes. Studies in mice and humans indicate that this receptor mediates cellular response to unmethylated CpG dinucleotides in bacterial DNA to mount an innate immune response.

TLR9 is usually activated by unmethylated CpG sequences in DNA molecules. Once activated, TLR9 moves from the endoplasmic reticulum to the Golgi apparatus and lysosomes, where it interacts with MyD88, the primary protein in its signaling pathway. TLR9 is cleaved at this stage to avoid whole protein expression on cell surface, which could lead to autoimmunity. CpG sites are relatively rare (~1%) on vertebrate genomes in comparison to bacterial genomes or viral DNA. TLR9 is expressed by numerous cells of the immune system such as B lymphocytes, monocytes, natural killer (NK) cells, keratinocytes, melanocytes, and plasmacytoid dendritic cells. TLR9 is expressed intracellularly, within the endosomal compartments and functions to alert the immune system of viral and bacterial infections by binding to DNA rich in CpG motifs. TLR9 signals leads to activation of the cells initiating pro-inflammatory reactions that result in the production of cytokines such as type-I interferon, IL-6, TNF and IL-12. There is also recent evidence that TLR9 can recognize nucleotides other than unmethylated CpG present in bacterial or viral genomes. TLR9 has been shown to recognized DNA:RNA hybrids.

== Role in non-viral cancer ==
TLR9 expression progression during cancer varies greatly with the type of cancer. TLR9 may even present an exciting new marker for many cancer types. Breast cancer and renal cell carcinoma have both been shown to diminish expression of TLR9. In these cases higher levels correspond with better outcomes. Conversely studies have shown higher levels of TLR9 expression in breast cancer and ovarian cancer patients, and poor prognosis is associated with higher TLR9 expression in prostate cancer. Non-small cell lung cancer and glioma have also been shown to up-regulate the expression of TLR9. While these results are highly variable, it is clear that TLR9 expression increases the capacity for invasion and proliferation. Whether cancer induces modification of TLR9 expression or TLR9 expression hastens the onset of cancer is unclear, but many of the mechanisms that regulate cancer development also play a role in TLR9 expression. DNA damage and the p53 pathway influence TLR9 expression, and the hypoxic environment of tumor cells certainly induces expression of TLR9, further increases proliferation ability of the cancerous cells. Cellular stress has also been shown to relate to TLR9 expression. It is possible that cancer and TLR9 have a feed-forward relationship, where the occurrence of one leads to the up-regulation of the other. Many viruses take advantage of this relationship by inducing certain TLR9 expression patterns to first infect the cell (down-regulate) then trigger the onset of cancer (up-regulate).

== Expression in oncogenic viral infection ==
=== Human papilloma virus (HPV) ===
Human papilloma virus is a common and widespread disease that, if left untreated, can lead to epithelial lesions and cervical cancer. HPV infection inhibits the expression of TLR9 in keratinocytes, abolishing the production of IL-8. However inhibition of TLR9 by oncogenic viruses is temporary, and patients with long-lasting HPV actually show higher levels of TLR9 expression in cervical cells. In fact, the increase in expression is so severe that TLR9 could be used as a biomarker for cervical cancer. The relationship between HPV-induced epithelial lesion, cancer progression, and TLR9 expression is still under investigation.

=== Hepatitis B virus (HBV) ===
Hepatitis B virus down-regulates the expression of TLR9 in pDCs and B cells, destroying the production of IFNα and IL-6. However, just as in HPV, as the disease progresses TLR9 expression is up-regulated. HBV induces an oncogenic transformation, which leads to a hypoxic cellular environment. This environment causes the release of mitochondrial DNA, which has CpG regions that can bind to TLR9. This induces over-expression of TLR9 in tumor cells, contrary to the inhibitory early stages of infection.

=== Epstein-Barr virus (EBV) ===
Epstein-Barr virus, like other oncogenic viruses, decreases the expression of TLR9 in B cells, diminishing production of TNF and IL-6. EBV has been reported to alter expression of TLR9 at the transcription, translation, and protein level.

=== Polyomavirus ===
The viruses of the polyomavirus family destroy expression of TLR9 in keratinocytes, inhibiting the release of IL-6 and IL-8. Expression is regulated at the promoter, where antigen proteins inhibit transcription. Similar to HPV and HBV infection, TLR9 expression increases as the disease progresses, probably due to the hypoxic nature of the solid tumor environment.

== Clinical relevance of inflammation response ==
TLR9 has been identified as a major player in systemic lupus erythematosus (SLE) and erythema nodosum leprosum (ENL). Loss of TLR9 exacerbates progression of SLE, and leads to increased activation of dendritic cells. TLR9 also controls the release of IgA and IFN-a in SLE, and loss of the receptor leads to higher levels of both molecules. In SLE, TLR9 and TLR7 have opposing effects. TLR9 regulates inflammatory response, while TLR7 promotes inflammatory response. TLR9 has an opposite effect in ENL. TLR9 is expressed at high levels on monocytes of ENL patients, and is positively linked to the secretion of proinflammatory cytokines TNF, IL-6, and IL-1β. TLR9 agonists and antagonists may be useful in treatment of a variety of inflammatory conditions, and research in this area is active. Autoimmune thyroid diseases have also been shown to correlate with an increase in expression of TLR9 on peripheral blood mononuclear cells (PBMCs). Patients with autoimmune thyroid diseases also have higher levels of the nuclear protein HMGB1 and RAGE protein, which together act as a ligand for TLR9. HMGB1 is released from lysed or damaged cells. HMGB1-DNA complex then binds to RAGE, and activates TLR9. TLR9 can work through MyD88, an adaptor molecule that increases the expression of NF-κB. However autoimmune thyroid diseases also increase sensitivity of MyD88 independent pathways. These pathways ultimately leads to the production of pro-inflammatory cytokines in PMBCs for patients with autoimmune thyroid diseases. Autoimmune diseases can also be triggered by activated cells undergoing apoptosis and being engulfed by antigen-presenting cells. Activation of cells leads to de-methylation, which exposes CpG regions of host DNA, allowing an inflammatory response to be activated through TLR9. Although it is possible that TLR9 also recognizes unmethylated DNA, TLR9 undoubtedly has a role in phagocytosis-induced autoimmunity.

== Role in heart health ==
Inflammatory responses mediated by TLR9 pathways can be activated by unmethylated CpG sequences that exist within human mitochondrial DNA. Usually, damaged mitochondria are digested via autophagy in cardiomyocytes, and mitochondrial DNA is digested by the enzyme DNase II. However, mitochondria that escape digestion via the lysosome/autophagy pathway can activate TLR9-induced inflammation via the NF-κB pathway. TLR9 expression in hearts with pressure overload leads to increased inflammation due to damaged mitochondria and activation of the CpG binding site on TLR9.

There is evidence that TLR9 may play a role in heart health for individuals who have already suffered a myocardial infarction. In murine trials, TLR9-deficient mice had less myofibroblast proliferation, meaning cardiac muscle recovery is connected to TLR9 expression. Furthermore, class B CpG sequences induce proliferation and differentiation of fibroblasts via the NF-κB pathway, the same pathway that initiates pro-inflammatory reactions in the immune responses. TLR9 shows specific activity in post-heart attack fibroblasts, inducing them to differentiate into myofibroblasts and speed repair of left ventricle tissue. In contrast to pre-myocardial infarction, cardiomyocytes in recovering hearts do not induce an inflammation response via TLR9/NF-κB pathway. Instead, the pathway leads to proliferation and differentiation of fibroblasts.

== Role in memory ==
Memories arise when hippocampal neurons respond to information, and a subset of these neurons assemble into a microcircuit representing the memory. This process appears to often involve activation of TLR9 signalling associated with the formation of centrosomal DNA damage repair complexes.

== As an immunotherapy target ==
There are new immunomodulatory treatments undergoing testing which involve the administration of artificial DNA oligonucleotides containing the CpG motif. CpG DNA has applications in treating allergies such as asthma, immunostimulation against cancer, immunostimulation against pathogens, and as adjuvants in vaccines.

=== TLR9 agonists ===
- Lefitolimod (MGN1703) in combination with ipilimumab (Yervoy) has started clinical trials to treat patients with advanced solid malignancies.
- Ongoing studies are investigating SD-101 in combination with pembrolizumab (Keytruda), an anti-PD-1 therapy developed by Merck.
- A Phase 1/2 trial is ongoing with tilsotolimod (IMO-2125) in combination with ipilimumab, an anti-CTLA-4 therapy developed by Bristol-Myers Squibb in anti-PD-1 refractory melanoma patients. FDA also granted fast track designation for tilsotolimod in combination with ipilimumab for treatment of PD-1 refractory metastatic melanoma. A phase 3 global trial (NCT03445533) in the same population began in 2018.

== Protein interactions ==
- TLR9 has been shown to interact with RNF216.
- Epidermal growth factor receptor (EGFR) is constitutively bound to TLR9.
- It can be activated by CpG Oligodeoxynucleotides such as Agatolimod.
