= Cyprodenate =

Chemical compound

Clinical data
- AHFS/Drugs.com: International Drug Names
- ATC code: N06BX04

Identifiers
- IUPAC name: 2-dimethylaminoethyl 3-cyclohexylpropanoate
- CAS Number: 15585-86-1
- PubChem CID: 71875
- ChemSpider: 64892
- UNII: I44VIC13P8
- KEGG: D07764
- ChEMBL: ChEMBL2106590
- CompTox Dashboard (EPA): DTXSID70165978
- ECHA InfoCard: 100.036.025

Chemical and physical data
- Formula: C_{13}H_{25}NO_{2}
- Molar mass: 227.348 g·mol^{−1}
- 3D model (JSmol): Interactive image
- SMILES: CN(C)CCOC(=O)CCC1CCCCC1
- InChI: InChI=1S/C13H25NO2/c1-14(2)10-11-16-13(15)9-8-12-6-4-3-5-7-12/h12H,3-11H2,1-2H3; Key:MPOYJPINNSIHAK-UHFFFAOYSA-N

Cyprodenate (Actebral) is a stimulant drug. It was used for counteracting the effects of benzodiazepine tranquillizer drugs before the development of newer antidotes such as flumazenil. It produces dimethylethanolamine as a metabolite.

== See also ==
- Meclofenoxate
