= Dibenzepin =

Chemical compound

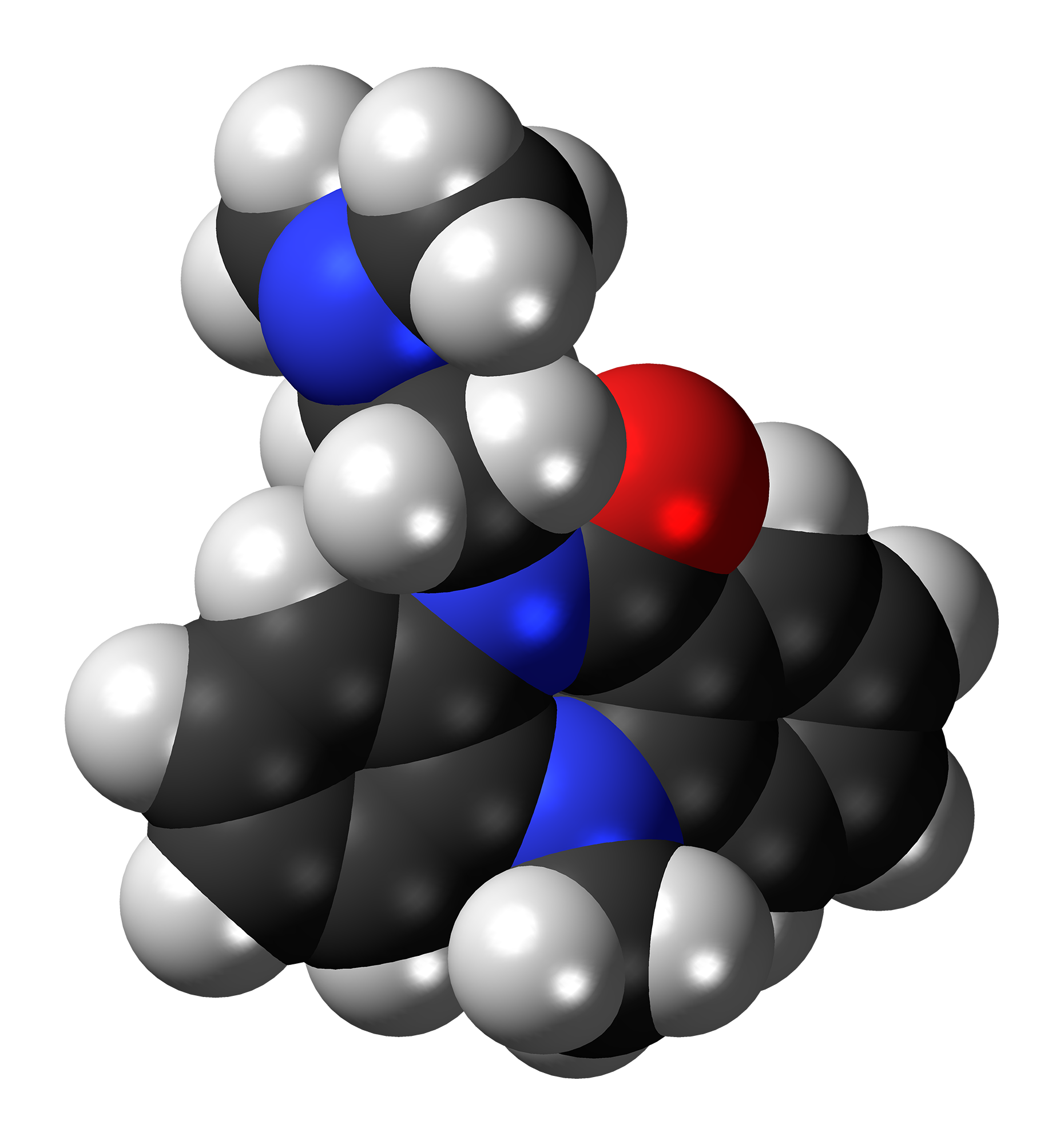

Clinical data
- Trade names: Noveril, Anslopax, Deprex, Ecatril, Neodit, Victoril
- AHFS/Drugs.com: International Drug Names
- Routes of administration: Oral
- ATC code: N06AA08 (WHO)

Legal status
- Legal status: BR: Class C1 (Other controlled substances); In general: ℞ (Prescription only)

Pharmacokinetic data
- Bioavailability: 25%
- Protein binding: 80%
- Metabolism: Hepatic
- Elimination half-life: 5 hours
- Excretion: Urine (80%), feces (20%)

Identifiers
- IUPAC name: 10-(2-(dimethylamino)ethyl)-5-methyl-5H-dibenzo[b,e][1,4]diazepin-11(10H)-one
- CAS Number: 4498-32-2
- PubChem CID: 9419
- ChemSpider: 9048
- UNII: 510SJZ1Y6L
- KEGG: D07812
- ChEMBL: ChEMBL1442422
- CompTox Dashboard (EPA): DTXSID7022916

Chemical and physical data
- Formula: C_{18}H_{21}N_{3}O
- Molar mass: 295.386 g·mol^{−1}
- 3D model (JSmol): Interactive image
- SMILES: O=C2c1c(cccc1)N(c3c(N2CCN(C)C)cccc3)C
- InChI: InChI=1S/C18H21N3O/c1-19(2)12-13-21-17-11-7-6-10-16(17)20(3)15-9-5-4-8-14(15)18(21)22/h4-11H,12-13H2,1-3H3; Key:QPGGEKPRGVJKQB-UHFFFAOYSA-N

Dibenzepin, sold under the brand name Noveril among others, is a tricyclic antidepressant (TCA) used widely throughout Europe for the treatment of depression. It has similar efficacy and effects relative to other TCAs like imipramine but with fewer side effects.

== Medical uses ==
Dibenzepin is used mainly in the treatment of major depressive disorder.

Like other TCAs, dibenzepin may have potential use in the treatment of chronic neuropathic pain.

== Overdose ==
As TCAs have a relatively narrow therapeutic index, the likelihood of overdose (both accidental and intentional) is fairly high and should be considered carefully by the prescribing physician prior to patient use. Symptoms of overdose are similar to those of other TCAs, with cardiac toxicity (due to inhibition of sodium and calcium channels) generally occurring before the threshold for serotonin syndrome is reached. Due to this risk, TCAs are rarely selected as the first-line treatment for depression.

== Pharmacology ==
=== Pharmacodynamics ===
Dibenzepin
Site	K_{i} (nM)	Species	Ref
SERT	ND	ND	ND
NET	ND	ND	
DAT	>100,000	Rat	
5-HT_{1A}	>10,000	Rat	
5-HT_{2A}	≥1,500	Rat	
5-HT_{2C}	ND	ND	ND
α_{1}	>10,000	Rat	
α_{2}	>10,000	Rat	
DA	>10,000	Bovine	
H_{1}	23	Human	
H_{2}	1,950	Human	
H_{3}	>100,000	Human	
H_{4}	>100,000	Human	
mACh	1,750	Rat	
Values are K_{i} (nM). The smaller the value, the more strongly the drug binds to the site.

Dibenzepin acts as a selective norepinephrine reuptake inhibitor (NRI), with similar potency to that of imipramine. It is also a potent antihistamine. The drug has weak or negligible effects on serotonin and dopamine reuptake. Unlike many other TCAs, dibenzepin has no antiadrenergic (α_{1}, α_{2}), antiserotonergic (5-HT_{1A}, 5-HT_{2A}), or antidopaminergic effects and has few or no anticholinergic (mACh) effects.

=== Pharmacokinetics ===
Therapeutic levels of dibenzepin are approximately 85 to 850 nM. Its plasma protein binding is approximately 80%.

== History ==
Dibenzepin was first introduced, in Switzerland and West Germany, in 1965. It was introduced in France in 1967, in Italy in 1968, in the United Kingdom in 1970, and in Japan in 1975. It was also marketed in a number of other countries, including Portugal and Israel.

== Society and culture ==
=== Brand names ===
Dibenzepin is or was marketed mainly under the brand name Noveril. It has also been marketed under a number of other brand names, including Ansiopax, Deprex, Ecatril, Neodit, and Victoril.
