= Nizofenone =

Chemical compound

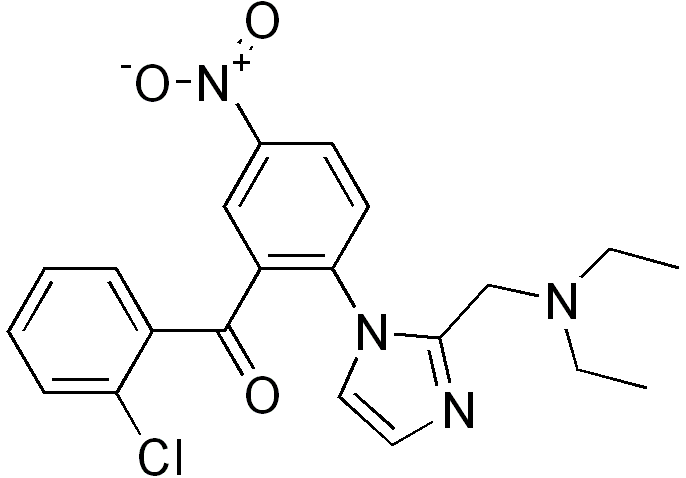

Clinical data
- AHFS/Drugs.com: International Drug Names
- ATC code: N06BX10 (WHO)

Identifiers
- IUPAC name: (2-chlorophenyl)(2-{2-[(diethylamino)methyl]-1H-imidazol-1-yl}-5-nitrophenyl)methanone
- CAS Number: 54533-85-6
- PubChem CID: 4514
- ChemSpider: 4357
- UNII: 7A2NOC3R88
- CompTox Dashboard (EPA): DTXSID401014745 DTXSID5048637, DTXSID401014745

Chemical and physical data
- Formula: C_{21}H_{21}ClN_{4}O_{3}
- Molar mass: 412.87 g·mol^{−1}
- 3D model (JSmol): Interactive image
- SMILES: Clc1ccccc1C(=O)c3cc([N+]([O-])=O)ccc3n2ccnc2CN(CC)CC
- InChI: InChI=1S/C21H21ClN4O3/c1-3-24(4-2)14-20-23-11-12-25(20)19-10-9-15(26(28)29)13-17(19)21(27)16-7-5-6-8-18(16)22/h5-13H,3-4,14H2,1-2H3; Key:WZGBZLHGOVJDET-UHFFFAOYSA-N

Nizofenone (Ekonal, Midafenone) is a neuroprotective drug which protects neurons from death following cerebral anoxia (interruption of oxygen supply to the brain). It might thus be useful in the treatment of acute neurological conditions such as stroke.
