= Meclofenoxate =

Chemical compound

Clinical data
- AHFS/Drugs.com: International Drug Names
- ATC code: N06BX01 (WHO)

Legal status
- Legal status: BR: Class C1 (Other controlled substances); US: Not FDA approved; In general: ℞ (Prescription only)

Identifiers
- IUPAC name: 2-Dimethylaminoethyl (4-chlorophenoxy)acetate
- CAS Number: 51-68-3
- PubChem CID: 4039
- ChemSpider: 3899
- UNII: C76QQ2I0RG
- KEGG: D00993
- CompTox Dashboard (EPA): DTXSID9046940
- ECHA InfoCard: 100.000.107

Chemical and physical data
- Formula: C_{12}H_{16}ClNO_{3}
- Molar mass: 257.71 g·mol^{−1}
- 3D model (JSmol): Interactive image
- SMILES: Clc1ccc(cc1)OCC(=O)OCCN(C)C
- InChI: InChI=1S/C12H16ClNO3/c1-14(2)7-8-16-12(15)9-17-11-5-3-10(13)4-6-11/h3-6H,7-9H2,1-2H3; Key:XZTYGFHCIAKPGJ-UHFFFAOYSA-N

Meclofenoxate (INN, BAN; brand name Lucidril, also known as centrophenoxine) is a cholinergic nootropic used as a dietary supplement. It is an ester of dimethylethanolamine (DMAE) and 4-chlorophenoxyacetic acid (pCPA).

In elderly patients, meclofenoxate has been shown to improve performance on certain memory tests. Meclofenoxate also increases cellular membrane phospholipids. It is sold in Japan and some European countries, such as Germany, Hungary, and Austria, as a prescription drug.

== Side effects ==
Meclofenoxate is considered to be safe and high in tolerability. However, possible side effects may include, rarely, insomnia, dizziness, restlessness, muscle tremor, depression, nausea, muscle tension, and headache; these side effects may be due to overdosage and may indicate the need for the dosage to be reduced.

== Research ==
Meclofenoxate, as well as DMAE, have been found to increase the lifespans of mice by 26.5%.

== Brand names ==
In addition to Lucidril, meclofenoxate has also been marketed under the brand names Amipolen, Analux, Brenal, Cellative, Centrophenoxin, Cerebron, Cerutil, Closete, Helfergin, Lucidryl, Lutiaron, Marucotol, Proserout, Proseryl, and Ropoxyl. In the US, meclofenoxate is sold as a dietary supplement, although it is an unapproved drug.

== See also ==
- Adafenoxate
- Cyprodenate
- ISRIB
