= Adafenoxate =

Names
- Preferred IUPAC name 2-[(Adamantan-1-yl)amino]ethyl (4-chlorophenoxy)acetate

Identifiers
| CAS Number | 82168-26-1 |
| 3D model (JSmol) | Interactive image |
| ChEMBL | ChEMBL2104053 |
| ChemSpider | 58080 |
| PubChem CID | 64517 |
| UNII | B8VQU4C05J |
| CompTox Dashboard (EPA) | DTXSID4046280 |
- InChI: InChI=1S/C20H26ClNO3/c21-17-1-3-18(4-2-17)25-13-19(23)24-6-5-22-20-10-14-7-15(11-20)9-16(8-14)12-20/h1-4,14-16,22H,5-13H2 Key: PLSMXIQMWYSHIV-UHFFFAOYSA-N; InChI=1/C20H26ClNO3/c21-17-1-3-18(4-2-17)25-13-19(23)24-6-5-22-20-10-14-7-15(11-20)9-16(8-14)12-20/h1-4,14-16,22H,5-13H2 Key: PLSMXIQMWYSHIV-UHFFFAOYAK
- SMILES: Clc4ccc(cc4)OCC(=O)OCCNC12CC3CC(C1)CC(C2)C3

Properties
| Chemical formula | C_{20}H_{26}ClNO_{3} |
| Molar mass | 363.88 g·mol^{−1} |
- Except where otherwise noted, data are given for materials in their standard state (at 25 °C [77 °F], 100 kPa). verify (what is ?) Infobox references

Adafenoxate is a compound related to centrophenoxine, that has been found to act as a nootropic in rats.

== Synthesis ==
Adafenoxate can be prepared starting with 4-chlorophenoxyacetic acid (pCPA) by converting it to its acid chloride to give 4-chlorophenoxyacetyl chloride (1). Esterification with 2-(1-adamantylamino)ethanol (2) gives adafenoxate (3).

Adafenoxate synthesis

Alternatives, the final step can be accomplished via Fischer–Speier esterification using a Dean-Stark trap.
