= Aderbasib =

Chemical compound

Clinical data
- Routes of administration: Oral
- ATC code: None

Legal status
- Legal status: Investigational

Identifiers
- IUPAC name: methyl (6S,7S)-7-(hydroxycarbamoyl)-6-[(4-phenyl-1-piperazinyl)carbonyl]-5-azaspiro[2.5]octane-5-carboxylate
- CAS Number: 791828-58-5
- PubChem CID: [https://pubchem.ncbi.nlm.nih.gov/compound/16070111 Q03790 16070111 Q03790]
- ChemSpider: 17229620
- UNII: V9YL6NEJ3G
- KEGG: [https://www.kegg.jp/entry/D09320 Q03790 D09320 Q03790]
- ChEMBL: ChEMBL2103790
- CompTox Dashboard (EPA): DTXSID701000327

Chemical and physical data
- Formula: C_{21}H_{28}N_{4}O_{5}
- Molar mass: 416.478 g·mol^{−1}
- 3D model (JSmol): Interactive image
- SMILES: COC(=O)N1CC2(CC2)C[C@@H]([C@H]1C(=O)N3CCN(CC3)C4=CC=CC=C4)C(=O)NO
- InChI: InChI=1S/C21H28N4O5/c1-30-20(28)25-14-21(7-8-21)13-16(18(26)22-29)17(25)19(27)24-11-9-23(10-12-24)15-5-3-2-4-6-15/h2-6,16-17,29H,7-14H2,1H3,(H,22,26)/t16-,17-/m0/s1; Key:DJXMSZSZEIKLQZ-IRXDYDNUSA-N

Aderbasib (codenamed INCB7839) is a sheddase inhibitor that may suppress tumor cell proliferation. Acting on multiple receptor classes and subclasses, aderbasib is observed to regulate the tumor necrosis factor of cancer cells. Aderbasib was being developed by Incyte as a potential adjunctive treatment for metastatic breast cancer. Development was halted in 2011 after positive findings from Phase II trials were contradicted by further research.

More specifically, aderbasib is an inhibitor of ADAM10 and ADAM17.
