= Noxiptiline =

Chemical compound

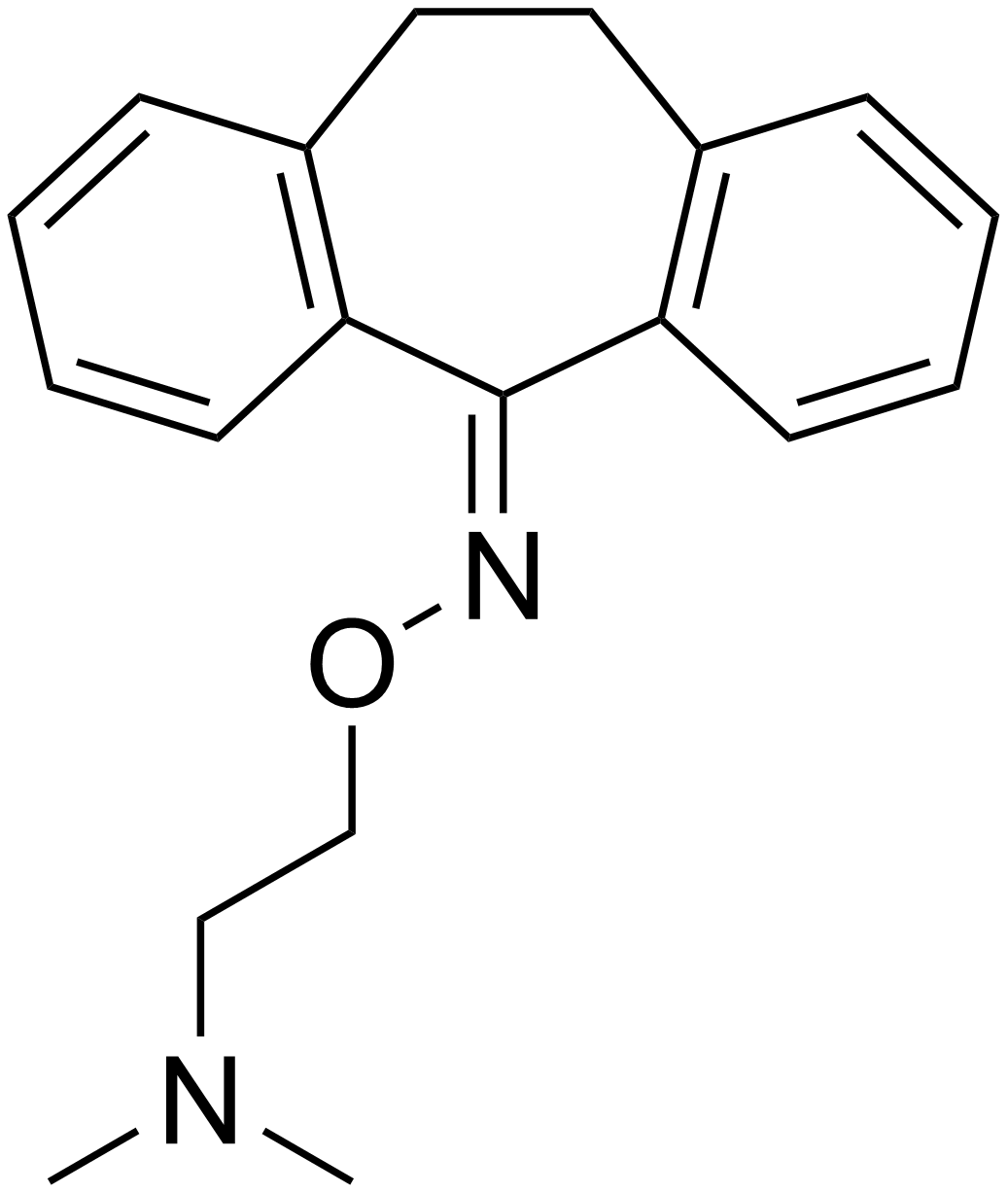

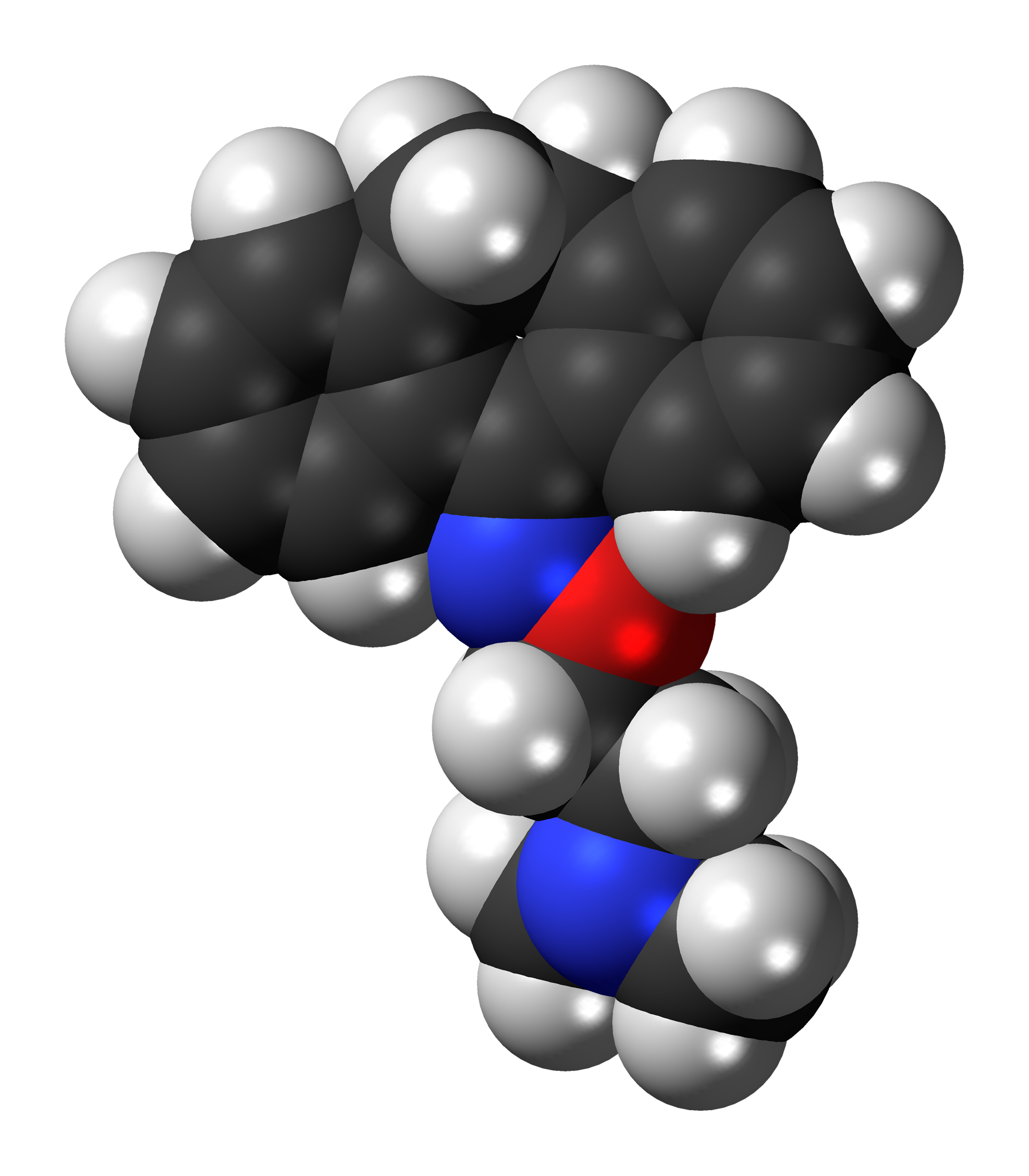

Clinical data
- Trade names: Agedal, Elronon, Nogedal
- Routes of administration: Oral
- ATC code: none

Legal status
- Legal status: BR: Class C1 (Other controlled substances); In general: ℞ (Prescription only)

Identifiers
- IUPAC name: 10,11-dihydro-5H-dibenzo[a,d]cyclohepten-5-one O-[2-dimethylamino)ethyl]oxime
- CAS Number: 3362-45-6; HCl: 4985-15-3
- PubChem CID: 21087
- ChemSpider: 19832
- UNII: DF7D3NY7EL; HCl: PNW59W2B94
- ChEBI: CHEBI:135232
- ChEMBL: ChEMBL1697689
- CompTox Dashboard (EPA): DTXSID10187311

Chemical and physical data
- Formula: C_{19}H_{22}N_{2}O
- Molar mass: 294.398 g·mol^{−1}
- 3D model (JSmol): Interactive image
- SMILES: O(\N=C2\c1c(cccc1)CCc3c2cccc3)CCN(C)C
- InChI: InChI=1S/C19H22N2O/c1-21(2)13-14-22-20-19-17-9-5-3-7-15(17)11-12-16-8-4-6-10-18(16)19/h3-10H,11-14H2,1-2H3; Key:GPTURHKXTUDRPC-UHFFFAOYSA-N

Noxiptiline (brand names Agedal, Elronon, Nogedal), also known as noxiptyline and dibenzoxine, is a tricyclic antidepressant (TCA) that was introduced in Europe in the 1970s for the treatment of depression. It has imipramine-like effects, acting as a serotonin and norepinephrine reuptake inhibitor, among other properties. Of the TCAs, noxiptiline has been described as one of the most effective, rivaling amitriptyline in clinical efficacy.

== Synthesis ==

The ketone dibenzosuberenone (1) is treated with hydroxylamine (2) to give its ketoxime (3). Base-catalyzed alkylation with ClCH_{2}CH_{2}N(CH_{3})_{2} (4) yields noxiptiline.
