= Imidacloprid/moxidectin =

Combination drug

Combination of
- Imidacloprid: Insecticide
- Moxidectin: Anthelmintic

Clinical data
- Trade names: Advantage Multi, Imoxi Topical Solution, Advocate
- License data: US DailyMed: Advantage multi
- Routes of administration: Topical
- ATCvet code: QP54AB52 (WHO)

Legal status
- Legal status: CA: ℞-only; US: ℞-only; EU: Rx-only

Imidacloprid/moxidectin, sold under the brand names Advantage Multi for Dogs and Advantage Multi for Cats among others, is a medication for dogs and cats to treat heartworm, fleas, sarcoptic mange, intestinal parasites and ear mites.

== Medical uses ==
Imidacloprid/moxidectin is indicated for the prevention of heartworm disease caused by Dirofilaria immitis in dogs and cats. Imidacloprid/moxidectin kills adult fleas (Ctenocephalides felis) and is indicated for the treatment of flea infestations in dogs and cats.

Imidacloprid/moxidectin is indicated for the treatment of Dirofilaria immitis circulating microfilariae in heartworm-positive dogs. Imidacloprid/moxidectin is indicated for the treatment and control of sarcoptic mange caused by Sarcoptes scabiei var. canis. Imidacloprid/moxidectin is also indicated for the treatment and control of the specific intestinal parasites. It is also indicated for the treatment and control of intestinal roundworms (Toxocara canis and Toxascaris leonina), hookworms (Ancylostoma caninum and Uncinaria stenocephala), and whipworms (Trichuris vulpis).

In cats, imidacloprid/moxidectin is indicated for the treatment and control of ear mite (Otodectes cynotis) infestations and the following intestinal parasites: adult, immature adult, and fourth stage larvae in hookworms (Ancylostoma tubaeforme); and adult and fourth stage larvae in roundworms (Toxocara cati).
