= Memantine =

Medication used to treat Alzheimer's disease

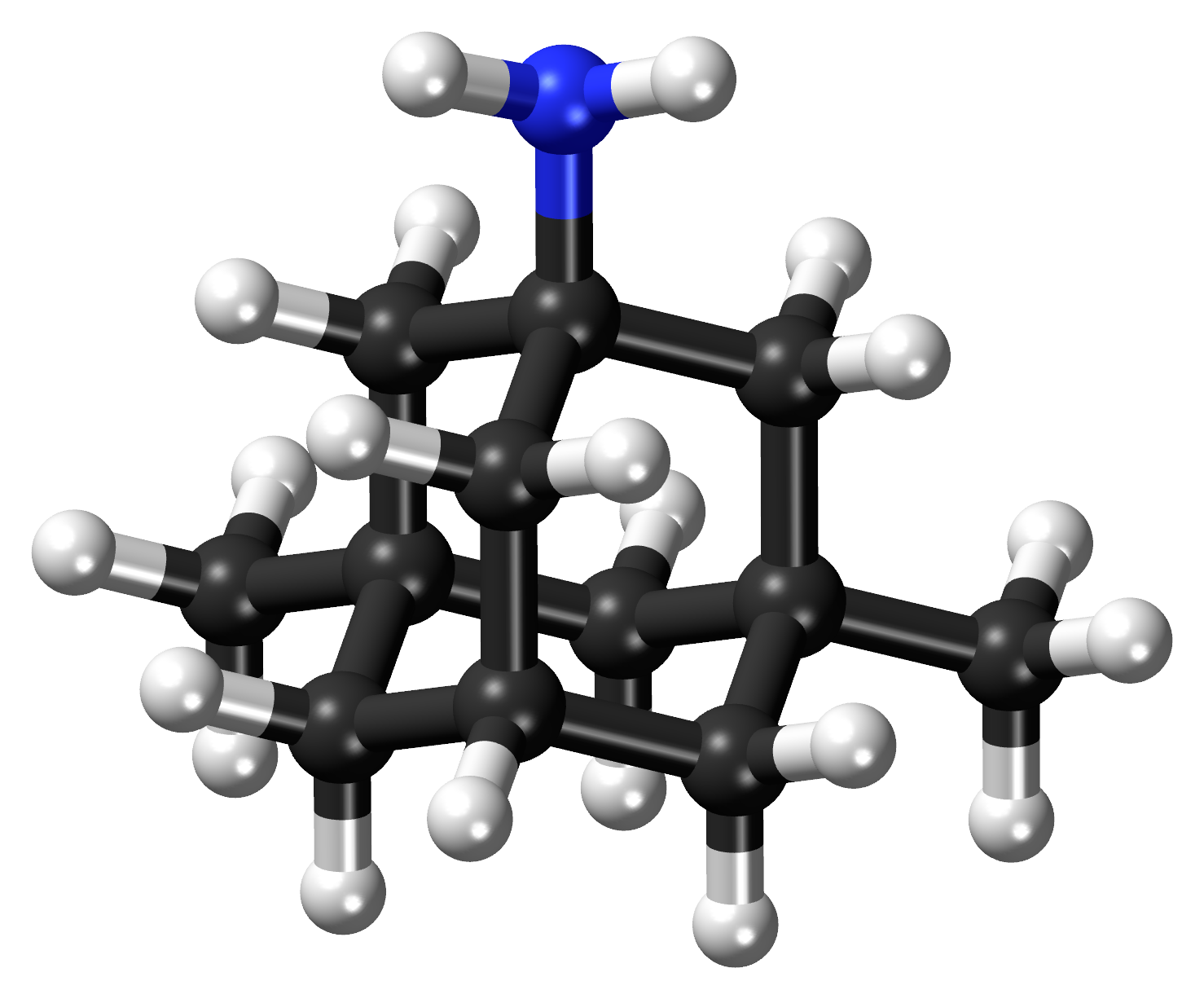

Clinical data
- Trade names: Axura, Ebixa, Namenda, others
- Other names: 1-Amino-3,5-dimethyladamantane; 3,5-Dimethyladamantan-1-amine; Dimethyladamantanamine; DMAA; D145; D-145
- AHFS/Drugs.com: Monograph
- MedlinePlus: a604006
- License data: US DailyMed: Memantine
- Pregnancy category: AU: B2
- Routes of administration: By mouth
- Drug class: NMDA receptor antagonist
- ATC code: N06DX01 (WHO)

Legal status
- Legal status: AU: S4 (Prescription only); BR: Class C1 (Other controlled substances); UK: POM (Prescription only); US: ℞-only; EU: Rx-only

Pharmacokinetic data
- Bioavailability: 100%
- Protein binding: 45%
- Metabolism: Minimal
- Metabolites: • Memantine glucuronide • 6-Hydroxymemantine • 1-Nitrosomemantine
- Elimination half-life: 60–80 hours
- Excretion: Urine (57–82% unchanged)

Identifiers
- IUPAC name: 3,5-dimethyltricyclo[3.3.1.1^{3,7}]decan-1-amine
- CAS Number: 19982-08-2; as HCl: 41100-52-1
- PubChem CID: 4054; as HCl: 181458
- IUPHAR/BPS: 4253
- DrugBank: DB01043; as HCl: DBSALT000456
- ChemSpider: 3914; as HCl: 157849
- UNII: W8O17SJF3T; as HCl: JY0WD0UA60
- KEGG: D08174; as HCl: D04905
- ChEBI: CHEBI:64312; as HCl: CHEBI:64323
- ChEMBL: ChEMBL807; as HCl: ChEMBL1699
- PDB ligand: 377 (PDBe, RCSB PDB)
- CompTox Dashboard (EPA): DTXSID5045174
- ECHA InfoCard: 100.217.937

Chemical and physical data
- Formula: C_{12}H_{21}N
- Molar mass: 179.307 g·mol^{−1}
- 3D model (JSmol): Interactive image; as HCl: Interactive image
- SMILES: NC12CC3CC(C)(C1)CC(C)(C3)C2; as HCl: Cl.NC12CC3CC(C)(C1)CC(C)(C3)C2
- InChI: InChI=1S/C12H21N/c1-10-3-9-4-11(2,6-10)8-12(13,5-9)7-10/h9H,3-8,13H2,1-2H3; Key:BUGYDGFZZOZRHP-UHFFFAOYSA-N; as HCl: InChI=1S/C12H21N.ClH/c1-10-3-9-4-11(2,6-10)8-12(13,5-9)7-10;/h9H,3-8,13H2,1-2H3;1H; Key:LDDHMLJTFXJGPI-UHFFFAOYSA-N

Memantine, sold under the brand name Namenda among others, is a medication used to slow the progression of moderate-to-severe Alzheimer's disease. It is taken by mouth.

Common side effects include headache, constipation, sleepiness, and dizziness. Severe side effects may include blood clots, psychosis, and heart failure. It is believed to work by acting on NMDA receptors, working as a pore blocker of these ion channels.

Memantine was first discovered in 1963. It was approved for medical use in Germany in 1989, in the European Union in 2002, and in the United States in 2003. It is available as a generic medication. In 2023, it was the 145th most commonly prescribed medication in the United States, with more than 3 million prescriptions.

== Medical uses ==
=== Alzheimer's disease and dementia ===
Memantine is used to treat moderate-to-severe Alzheimer's disease, especially for people who are intolerant of or have a contraindication to AChE (acetylcholinesterase) inhibitors. One guideline recommends memantine or an AChE inhibitor be considered in people in the early-to-mid stage of dementia.

Memantine has been associated with a modest improvement; with small positive effects on cognition, mood, behavior, and the ability to perform daily activities in moderate-to-severe Alzheimer's disease. There does not appear to be any benefit in mild disease.

Memantine when added to donepezil in those with moderate-to-severe dementia resulted in "limited improvements" in a 2017 review. The UK National Institute for Clinical Excellence (NICE) issued guidance in 2018 recommending consideration of the combination of memantine with donepezil in those with moderate-to-severe dementia.

=== Radiation therapy ===
Memantine has been recommended for use by professional organization consensus to prevent neurocognitive decline after whole brain radiotherapy.

== Adverse effects ==
Memantine is, in general, well tolerated. Common adverse drug reactions (≥1% of people) include confusion, dizziness, drowsiness, headache, insomnia, agitation, and/or hallucinations. Less common adverse effects include vomiting, anxiety, hypertonia, cystitis, and increased libido.

Like many other NMDA receptor antagonists, memantine behaves as a dissociative anesthetic at supratherapeutic doses. Despite isolated reports, recreational use of memantine is rare due to the drug's long duration and limited availability. Additionally, memantine seems to lack effects such as euphoria or hallucinations.

Memantine appears to be generally well tolerated by children with autism spectrum disorder.

== Pharmacology ==
=== Pharmacodynamics ===
Memantine is an uncompetitive NMDA receptor antagonist, with an IC50 binding affinity of ~500-1,000 nM (0.5-1 μM), but displays higher potency at extrasynaptic NMDA receptors (IC50 = ~22 nM), suggesting preferential inhibition of pathological glutamatergic signaling.

Memantine also exhibits activity at several other receptors:

- Dopamine D_{2}^{High} receptor agonist (IC50 affinity = ~137-917 nM); increases dopaminergic activity in the prefrontal cortex and striatum. Memantine may inhibit the release of prolactin through D2 agonism, based on studies from isolated anterior pituitary cells.
- Alpha 7 nicotinic acetylcholine receptor antagonist (IC50 affinity = 340nM-5,000 nM or 0.34-5 μM).
- 5-HT_{3} receptor receptor antagonist (IC50 affinity = ~1,000 nM).
- Believed to block NMDA overactivation and restore cognitive dysfunction without significantly impairing normal synaptic transmission.
- No meaningful acetylcholinesterase (AChE) inhibition.

==== Glutamatergic ====
A dysfunction of glutamatergic neurotransmission, manifested as neuronal excitotoxicity, is hypothesized to be involved in the etiology of Alzheimer's disease. Targeting the glutamatergic system, specifically ionotropic glutamate NMDA receptors, offers a novel approach to treatment in view of the limited efficacy of existing drugs targeting the cholinergic system.

Memantine is a low-affinity voltage-dependent uncompetitive antagonist at glutamatergic NMDA receptors with an IC50 binding affinity of ~500-1,000 nM (0.5-1 μM), but displays higher potency at extrasynaptic NMDA receptors (~22 nM).

Magnesium (Mg^{2}+), the natural NMDA channel blocker, has an apparent dissociation constant (Ka/Ki) of roughly 2-3 mM (2,000,000-3,000,000 nM), making memantine ~1000x stronger at NMDA than Mg2+. By binding to the NMDA receptor with a higher affinity than Mg^{2+}, memantine is able to inhibit the prolonged influx of Ca^{2+} ions, particularly from extrasynaptic receptors, which forms the basis of neuronal excitotoxicity. The low affinity, uncompetitive nature, and rapid off-rate kinetics of memantine at the level of the NMDA receptor channel, however, preserve the function of the receptor at synapses, as it can still be activated by physiological release of glutamate following depolarization of the postsynaptic neuron. The interaction of memantine with NMDA receptors plays a major role in the symptomatic improvement that the drug produces in Alzheimer's disease. However, there is no evidence yet that memantine's ability to protect against extrasynaptic NMDA receptor-mediated excitotoxicity has a disease-modifying effect in Alzheimer's disease, although this has been suggested in animal models.

==== Serotonergic ====
Memantine acts as a non-competitive antagonist of the serotonin 5-HT_{3} receptor, with a potency similar to that for the NMDA receptor. Many 5-HT_{3} receptor antagonists function as antiemetics, however the clinical significance of this anti-serotonergic activity of memantine in Alzheimer's disease is unknown.

==== Cholinergic ====
Memantine acts as a non-competitive antagonist at the α_{7} nicotinic acetycholine receptor (IC50 affinity = 340nM-5,000nM or 0.34-5 μM). Several studies have observed that Memantine's antagonism at nAChRs is higher than both its affinity to NMDA and 5-HT_{3} receptors, but this may be difficult to ascertain with accuracy due to rapid desensitization of nAChRs.

Antagonism of α_{7} nAChRs may contribute to the initial worsening of cognitive function during early Memantine treatment. Nicotinic acetylcholine receptor, specifically α_{7} nAChR, upregulate quickly in response to antagonism, which could explain the possible cognitive-enhancing effects of Memantine. It has been shown that the number of nicotinic receptors in the brain are reduced in Alzheimer's disease, even in the absence of a general decrease in the number of neurons, and nicotinic receptor agonists are viewed as interesting targets for anti-Alzheimer drugs.

==== Dopaminergic ====
Memantine has been shown to act as an agonist of dopamine D_{2}^{High} receptor with equal or slightly higher affinity than to NMDA receptors (D2 IC50 affinity = ~137-917 nM). In another study, Memantine was shown to increase dopaminergic activity in the prefrontal cortex and striatum of mice.

At least one study questions the relevance of Memantine's D_{2} receptor action, suggesting a low Ki value.

==== Sigmaergic ====
Memantine acts as a weak agonist of the sigma σ_{1} receptor with low affinity (K_{i} = 2,600nM or 2.6 μM). Due to this low affinity, therapeutic concentrations of memantine are most likely too low to have any sigmaergic effect as a typical therapeutic dose is 20 mg. The consequences of sigma activity would be unclear, as the role of sigma receptors in general is currently not very well understood. However, excessive doses of memantine taken for recreational purposes, which are many times greater than prescribed doses, may indeed activate this receptor.

==== Other actions ====
Memantine does not appear to inhibit or induce several cytochrome P450 enzymes including CYP3A4/5, CYP1A2, CYP2D6, and CYP2C9. It also does not inhibit CYP2A6 or CYP2E1. However, it might have a small effect on CYP2B6.

=== Pharmacokinetics ===
==== Absorption ====
The oral bioavailability of memantine is 100%. Time to peak levels of memantine are 3 to 7 hours. Food has no influence on the rate of absorption. Memantine exposure is linear over a dose range of 10 to 40 mg. Peak levels after a single 20 mg dose were found to be 24 to 29 μg/L (0.13–0.16 μmol/L or μM). Steady-state levels of memantine with 20 mg/day are in the range of 0.5 to 1.0 μM.

==== Distribution ====
Memantine has a relatively high volume of distribution (V_{d}) of 9 to 11 L/kg. It easily crosses biological membranes, is widely distributed throughout the body, and crosses the blood–brain barrier into the central nervous system. The drug is transported across the blood–brain barrier by the organic cation transporter novel 1 (OCTN1). The plasma protein binding of memantine is 45% and is described as very low and not clinically significant. Because of its low plasma protein binding, it is unlikely to interact with other highly protein-bound drugs such as warfarin or digoxin.

==== Metabolism ====
Memantine does not undergo extensive metabolism. It is negligibly metabolized by the cytochrome P450 enzymes. As a result, it has a decreased potential for drug interactions. Metabolites of memantine include memantine glucuronide, 6-hydroxymemantine, and 1-nitrosomemantine, all of which show minimal activity as NMDA receptor antagonists.

==== Elimination ====
Memantine is eliminated primarily in urine, with 57 to 82% excreted in urine unchanged. Its elimination half-life is 60 to 80 hours. The renal clearance of memantine is dependent on urinary pH. More alkaline urine slows the elimination of memantine, whereas more acidic urine accelerates its elimination.

== Chemistry ==
Memantine, also known as 3,5-dimethyl-1-aminoadamantane, is an adamantane derivative and is closely structurally related to amantadine (1-aminoadamantane) and other adamantane derivatives.

The synthesis of memantine has been described.

== History ==
Memantine was first synthesized, patented, and described by Eli Lilly and Company in 1963 as an anti-diabetic agent, but it was ineffective at lowering blood sugar. By 1972, it was discovered to have central nervous system (CNS) activity, and was developed by Merz for treatment of neurological diseases, such as Parkinson's disease. Memantine was first studied in the treatment of Alzheimer's disease in 1986. The drug was first marketed for dementia in 1989 in Germany under the name Axura.

It was not discovered to act as an NMDA receptor antagonist until 1989, after clinical trials had initiated. Prior to this, it was theorized to directly and/or indirectly modulate the dopaminergic, noradrenergic, and serotonergic systems. However, these actions were later realized to occur at 100-fold higher concentrations than those achieved therapeutically and hence are unlikely to be involved in its effects.

In the United States, some CNS activities were discovered at Children's Hospital of Boston in 1990, and Children's licensed patents covering uses of memantine outside the field of ophthalmology to Neurobiological Technologies (NTI) in 1995. In 1998, NTI amended its agreement with Children's to allow Merz to take over development.

In 2000, Merz partnered with Forest to develop the drug for Alzheimer's disease in the United States under the brand name Namenda. In 2000, Merz partnered with Suntory for the Japanese market and with Lundbeck for other markets including Europe; the drug was originally marketed by Lundbeck under the name Ebixa. Memantine was approved in the European Union in 2002 and in the United States in 2003.

Sales of the drug reached $1.8 billion for 2014. The cost of Namenda was $269 to $489 a month in 2012.

In February 2014, as the July 2015 patent expiration for memantine neared, Actavis, which had acquired Forest, announced that it was launching an extended release (XR) form of memantine that could be taken once a day instead of twice a day as needed with the then-current "immediate release" (IR) version, and that it intended to stop selling the IR version in August 2014 and withdraw the marketing authorization. This is a tactic to thwart generic competition called product hopping. However the supply of the XR version ran short, so Actavis extended the deadline until the fall. In September 2014 the attorney general of New York, Eric Schneiderman, filed a lawsuit to compel Actavis to keep selling the IR version on the basis of antitrust law.

In December 2014, a judge granted New York State its request and issued an injunction, preventing Actavis from withdrawing the IR version until generic versions could launch. Actavis appealed and in May a panel of the Second Circuit Court of Appeals upheld the injunction, and in June Actavis asked that its case be heard by the full Second Circuit panel. In August 2015, Actavis' request was denied.

== Society and culture ==
=== Recreational use ===
Recreational use of memantine at supratherapeutic doses has been reported. It is a weak NMDA receptor antagonist and is reported to produce dissociative and phencyclidine (PCP)-like effects in animals and humans at sufficiently high doses. Even therapeutic doses have been found to produce mild dissociative-like effects in clinical studies. In any case, the very long duration of action of memantine (>40 hours) has likely limited its misuse potential. Recreational use of the related drug amantadine has similarly been reported.

A study examining self-reported use of memantine on the social network Reddit showed that the drug was used both recreationally and as a nootropic, but also that it was misused in various illnesses as self-medication without strong scientific basis.

=== Brand names ===
As of August 2017, memantine is marketed under many brand names worldwide including Abixa, Adaxor, Admed, Akatinol, Alceba, Alios, Almenta, Alois, Alzant, Alzer, Alzia, Alzinex, Alzixa, Alzmenda, Alzmex, Axura, Biomentin, Carrier, Cogito, Cognomem, Conexine, Cordure, Dantex, Demantin, Demax, Dementa, Dementexa, Ebitex, Ebixa, Emantin, Emaxin, Esmirtal, Eutebrol, Evy, Ezemantis, Fentina, Korint, Lemix, Lindex, Lucidex, Manotin, Mantine, Mantomed, Marbodin, Mardewel, Marixino, Maruxa, Maxiram, Melanda, Memabix, Memamed, Memando, Memantin, Memantina, Memantine, Mémantine, Memantinol, Memantyn, Memanvitae, Memanxa, Memanzaks, Memary, Memax, Memexa, Memigmin, Memikare, Memogen, Memolan, Memorel, Memorix, Memotec, Memox, Memxa, Mentikline, Mentium, Mentixa, Merandex, Merital, Mexia, Mimetix, Mirvedol, Modualz, Morysa, Namenda, Nemdatine, Nemedan, Neumantine, Neuro-K, Neuroplus, Noojerone, Pertam, Polmatine, Prilben, Pronervon, Ravemantine, Talentum, Timantila, Tingreks, Tonibral, Tormoro, Valcoxia, Vilimen, Vivimex, Witgen, Xapimant, Ymana, Zalatine, Zemertinex, Zenmem, and Zimerz.

It is marketed in some countries as a combination drug with donepezil (memantine/donepezil) under the brand names Namzaric, Neuroplus Dual, and Tonibral MD.

== Research ==
=== Psychiatric disorders ===
Memantine has been studied and used off-label in the treatment of a variety of psychiatric disorders. These include depression, bipolar disorder, schizophrenia, obsessive–compulsive disorder (OCD), substance misuse, pervasive developmental disorders (PDDs), and binge eating disorder (BED). A 2008 systematic review concluded that although it was promising for such uses, memantine could not be recommended for such indications due to inadequate data.

Memantine does not appear to be effective in the treatment of unipolar major depression or bipolar depression on the basis of systematic reviews and meta-analyses, including a 2021 Cochrane review. However, a 2022 systematic review and meta-analysis concluded that memantine was significantly effective in the treatment of depressive symptoms in various psychiatric disorders, although with a very small effect size (Hedges' g = -0.17).

There are likewise limited data to support memantine in the treatment of schizophrenia based on systematic reviews and meta-analyses. However, a 2019 systematic review and meta-analysis reported that memantine was effective in the treatment of the negative and cognitive symptoms of schizophrenia with medium to large effect sizes.

=== Parkinson's disease ===
Memantine has been studied in the treatment of Parkinson's disease since the early 1970s. Whereas the related drug amantadine is approved for the treatment of Parkinson's disease and has been since the early 1970s, memantine is not approved for the treatment of Parkinson's disease as of 2024. However, it has been said that memantine, along with amantadine, has been widely used as an antiparkinsonian agent since at least 1994.

Although amantadine and memantine have fairly similar pharmacology, it has been said that memantine does not share the antidyskinetic effects of amantadine. However, findings are conflicting, and some data suggest that memantine may also have antidyskinetic effects. Similarly to amantadine and dopamine receptor agonists, memantine reverses haloperidol-induced catalepsy and monoamine depletion-induced sedation in animals. Memantine has been found to reduce bradykinesia and resting tremor in people with Parkinson's disease. Memantine and amantadine are said to have moderate anti-akinetic effects in the treatment of Parkinson's disease. The doses of memantine used for Parkinson's disease are about 5- to 10-fold lower than those of amantadine, which has been attributed to greater potency of memantine.

As of 2022, a phase 3 clinical trial is studying the potential of memantine as disease-modifying treatment for Parkinson's disease that might slow progression of the disease. It is specifically theorized to act by inhibiting cell-to-cell transmission of α-synuclein.

Besides Parkinson's disease, memantine has been studied in the treatment of Parkinson's disease dementia (PDD) and dementia with Lewy bodies (DLB).

=== Apathy ===
Apathy is a disorder of diminished motivation characterized by diminished interest and activity. Systematic reviews and meta-analyses published from 2016 to 2022 have found that memantine is not effective in the treatment of apathy in Alzheimer's disease and other dementias. However, another 2022 review reported that it was effective.

=== Long COVID ===
Memantine, along with amantadine, is being studied and used off-label in the treatment of long COVID.

=== Catatonia ===
Memantine, along with amantadine, has been reported to be effective in the treatment of catatonia in case reports and case series.

=== Autism spectrum disorder ===
There is no evidence that memantine improves symptoms of autism spectrum disorder. A 2024 meta-analysis of NMDA antagonists (including memantine) found no benefit over placebo on core or associated symptoms and more adverse events, while a 2022 review concluded the effect on core symptoms is uncertain.
