= Adozelesin =

Identifiers
CAS Number	110314-48-2
3D model (JSmol)	Interactive image
ChEMBL	ChEMBL35493
ChemSpider	317091
KEGG	D02773
PubChem CID	357194
UNII	6N3M4XJR2V
CompTox Dashboard (EPA)	DTXSID00891354
- InChI: InChI=1S/C30H22N4O4/c1-15-13-31-27-22(35)11-25-30(26(15)27)12-18(30)14-34(25)29(37)21-9-17-8-19(6-7-20(17)33-21)32-28(36)24-10-16-4-2-3-5-23(16)38-24/h2-11,13,18,31,33H,12,14H2,1H3,(H,32,36) Key: BYRVKDUQDLJUBX-UHFFFAOYSA-N; InChI=1/C30H22N4O4/c1-15-13-31-27-22(35)11-25-30(26(15)27)12-18(30)14-34(25)29(37)21-9-17-8-19(6-7-20(17)33-21)32-28(36)24-10-16-4-2-3-5-23(16)38-24/h2-11,13,18,31,33H,12,14H2,1H3,(H,32,36) Key: BYRVKDUQDLJUBX-UHFFFAOYAA
- SMILES: CC1=CNC2=C1C34CC3CN(C4=CC2=O)C(=O)C5=CC6=C(N5)C=CC(=C6)NC(=O)C7=CC8=CC=CC=C8O7

Properties
Chemical formula	C_{30}H_{22}N_{4}O_{4}
Molar mass	502.530 g·mol^{−1}
- Except where otherwise noted, data are given for materials in their standard state (at 25 °C [77 °F], 100 kPa). Infobox references

Adozelesin is an experimental antitumor drug of the duocarmycin class. It binds to and alkylates DNA, resulting in a reduction of both cellular and simian virus 40 (SV40) DNA replication which ultimately reduces the rate of cancer growth.
