= Adrabetadex =

Cyclodextrin-based medication

Clinical data
- Pronunciation: /ˌædrəˈbeɪtədɛks/ AD-rə-BAY-tə-dex
- Trade names: Lembaz
- Other names: VT-270, VTS-270
- AHFS/Drugs.com: Lembaz
- License data: US DailyMed: Adrabetadex
- Routes of administration: Intrathecal
- Drug class: β-Cyclodextrin
- ATC code: None

Legal status
- Legal status: US: ℞-only

Identifiers
- IUPAC name: (1S,3R,5R,6S,8R,10R,11S,13S,15R,16S,18R,20R,21S,23R,25R,26S,28R,30R,31S,33R,35R,36R,37R,38R,39R,40R,41R,42R,43R,44R,45R,47R,48S,49R)-5,20,30,35-tetrakis(hydroxymethyl)-49-(2-hydroxypropoxy)-10,15,25-tris(2-hydroxypropoxymethyl)-2,4,7,9,12,14,17,19,22,24,27,29,32,34-tetradecaoxaoctacyclo[31.2.2.2^{3,6}.2^{8,11}.2^{13,16}.2^{18,21}.2^{23,26}.2^{28,31}]nonatetracontane-36,37,38,39,40,41,42,43,44,45,47,48-dodecol
- CAS Number: 128446-35-5
- PubChem CID: 138059665
- DrugBank: DB15146
- UNII: 8W6Q67R6NX
- ChEBI: CHEBI:757136
- ChEMBL: ChEMBL4297678

Chemical and physical data
- Formula: C_{54}H_{94}O_{38}
- Molar mass: 1351.308 g·mol^{−1}
- 3D model (JSmol): Interactive image
- SMILES: CC(COC[C@@H]1[C@@H]2C[C@H]([C@H](O1)O[C@@H]3[C@H](O[C@@H]([C@@H]([C@H]3O)OCC(C)O)O[C@@H]4[C@H](O[C@@H]([C@@H]([C@H]4O)O)O[C@@H]5[C@H](O[C@@H]([C@@H]([C@H]5O)O)O[C@@H]6[C@H](O[C@@H]([C@@H]([C@H]6O)O)O[C@@H]7[C@H](O[C@@H]([C@@H]([C@H]7O)O)O[C@@H]8[C@H](O[C@H](O2)[C@@H]([C@H]8O)O)COCC(C)O)CO)COCC(C)O)CO)CO)CO)O)O
- InChI: InChI=InChI=1S/C54H94O38/c1-17(59)10-75-14-27-22-5-21(63)48(84-27)87-44-26(9-58)83-54(47(40(44)74)78-13-20(4)62)92-43-25(8-57)82-50(38(72)32(43)66)88-41-23(6-55)80-52(36(70)30(41)64)91-46-29(16-77-12-19(3)61)86-53(39(73)34(46)68)89-42-24(7-56)81-51(37(71)31(42)65)90-45-28(15-76-11-18(2)60)85-49(79-22)35(69)33(45)67/h17-74H,5-16H2,1-4H3/t17?,18?,19?,20?,21-,22+,23-,24-,25-,26-,27-,28-,29-,30-,31-,32-,33-,34-,35-,36-,37-,38-,39-,40+,41-,42-,43-,44-,45-,46-,47-,48-,49+,50-,51-,52-,53-,54-/m1/s1; Key:NJWCVQBHNBLNOZ-ZRMYETLXSA-N

Adrabetadex, sold under the brand name Lembaz, (/lɛmbæz/) LEM-baz; is a cyclodextrin-based cyclic oligosaccharide therapeutic used for the treatment of Niemann–Pick disease type C. It is given by intrathecal injection (injection into the spinal canal.) Adrabetadex is the first approved treatment in the US for infantile-onset Niemann–Pick disease type C (I-NPC), a severe, early-appearing form of NPC that has signs before a person reaches age 6, characterized by hypotonia (low muscle tone), and delayed motor milestones such as learning to walk and speech delay. Hepatosplenomegaly (enlargement of the liver and spleen) and/or prolonged neonatal jaundice are almost always present.

The most common adverse reactions included hearing impairment, ataxia, fatigue, vomiting, back pain, headache, pyrexia, diarrhea, nausea, and cough. Aspiration pneumonia from breathing food or fluids into the lungs has also occurred around the time of treatment, including one case that was fatal. It is not clear whether this was due to adrabetadex, the sedation that is sometimes used, or the underlying disease (NPC).

Adrabetadex was approved for medical use in the United States in November 2026.

== Medical uses ==
Adrabetadex is indicated to reduce the risk of mortality in adult and pediatric patients, who weigh 7 kg or greater, with Niemann–Pick disease type C (NPC) with neurological manifestations that started at less than 6 years of age.

Niemann–Pick disease type C (NPC) is a rare, inherited lysosomal storage disorder affecting an estimated 1 in 150,000 people, in which the body cannot properly process cholesterol and other fats inside cells. Over time, these substances accumulate, particularly in the brain, causing progressive neurological decline, including loss of movement, coordination, and the ability to swallow. Patients whose neurological symptoms begin before age 6 face the most serious form of the disease.

== Adverse effects ==
The US prescription label includes warnings and precautions for hearing impairment, including permanent hearing loss, ataxia, and fatigue.

== Mechanism of action ==
Adrabetadex works by targeting the underlying cholesterol problem in Niemann–Pick disease type C (NPC). In NPC, a faulty protein cannot move cholesterol properly, so cholesterol becomes trapped inside cells, which is especially damaging to the brain and nervous system. Adrabetadex is a cyclodextrin-based medicine that binds to cholesterol and helps move it out of the lysosome, a storage and recycling compartment inside the cell, reducing the buildup of cholesterol and related fats. The precise way this lowers the risk of death in NPC has not been fully established.

== History ==
To assess whether adrabetadex reduced the risk of death, the US Food and Drug Administration (FDA) examined the survival of 36 patients treated with adrabetadex across three clinical studies and an expanded access program. All patients had neurological manifestations of NPC that occurred prior to age 6. Patients treated with adrabetadex had longer overall survival compared to the matched external control group, with a 55% reduction in the risk of death. The median survival time was 8.5 years for the treated group compared with 4.9 years in the control group. This survival benefit was observed regardless of whether patients were also taking miglustat, a therapy used off-label in NPC.

== Society and culture ==
=== Legal status ===
Adrabetadex was approved for medical use in the United States in November 2026. Adrabetadex received breakthrough therapy designation. The FDA granted approval of Lembaz to Mandos, LLC, a subsidiary of Beren Therapeutics, PBC.

=== Names ===
Adrabetadex is the international nonproprietary name.

Adrabetadex is sold under the brand name Lembaz.
