= Niraparib/abiraterone acetate =

Combination medication

Combination of
- Niraparib: Antineoplastic agent
- Abiraterone acetate: Hormone antagonist

Clinical data
- Trade names: Akeega
- License data: US DailyMed: Akeega
- Routes of administration: By mouth
- ATC code: L01XK52 (WHO)

Legal status
- Legal status: US: ℞-only; EU: Rx-only

Identifiers
- KEGG: D12653

Niraparib/abiraterone acetate, sold under the brand name Akeega, is a fixed-dose combination anti-cancer medication used for the treatment of prostate cancer. It contains niraparib, a poly (ADP-ribose) polymerase (PARP) inhibitor (antineoplastic agent), and abiraterone acetate, a CYP17 inhibitor (hormone antagonist).

The most common side effects include anemia (low levels of red blood cells), high blood pressure, constipation, tiredness, nausea, thrombocytopenia (low levels of blood platelets), difficulty breathing, back pain, reduced appetite, neutropenia (low levels of neutrophils, a type of white blood cell), joint pain, vomiting, low levels of potassium, dizziness, difficulty sleeping, high blood glucose levels, and urinary tract infection.

Niraparib/abiraterone acetate was approved for medical use in the European Union in April 2023, and in the United States in August 2023.

== Medical uses ==
In the European Union, niraparib/abiraterone is indicated for the treatment of adults with prostate cancer. It is for people who have genetic mutations known as BRCA 1/2 mutations and who cannot have chemotherapy. It is used in combination with prednisolone or another medicine prednisone, which is converted into prednisolone.

In the United States, niraparib/abiraterone is indicated, in combination with prednisone, for adults with deleterious or suspected deleterious BRCA-mutated castration-resistant prostate cancer, as determined by an FDA-approved test.

== History ==
Efficacy was evaluated in cohort 1 of MAGNITUDE (NCT03748641), a randomized, double-blind, placebo-controlled trial enrolling 423 participants with homologous recombination repair (HRR) gene-mutated mCRPC. Participants were randomized (1:1) to receive niraparib 200 mg and abiraterone acetate 1,000 mg plus prednisone 10 mg daily or placebo and abiraterone acetate plus prednisone daily. Participants were required to have a prior orchiectomy or be receiving gonadotropin-releasing hormone (GnRH) analogues. Participants with mCRPC were eligible if they had not received prior systemic therapy in the mCRPC setting except for a short duration of prior abiraterone acetate plus prednisone (up to four months) and ongoing ADT. Participants could have received prior docetaxel or androgen-receptor (AR) targeted therapies in earlier disease settings. Randomization was stratified by prior docetaxel, prior AR targeted therapy, prior abiraterone acetate plus prednisone, and BRCA status. Of the 423 participants enrolled, 225 (53%) had prospectively determined BRCA gene mutations (BRCAm). No benefit was observed in mCRPC participants without an HRR gene mutation (Cohort 2 of MAGNITUDE) as the criterion for futility was met.

== Society and culture ==
=== Legal status ===
On 23 February 2023, the Committee for Medicinal Products for Human Use (CHMP) of the European Medicines Agency (EMA) adopted a positive opinion, recommending the granting of a marketing authorization for the medicinal product Akeega, intended for the treatment of adults with metastatic castration-resistant prostate cancer with BRCA 1/BRCA 2 mutations. The applicant for this medicinal product is Janssen-Cilag International N.V. Niraparib/abiraterone acetate was approved for medical use in the European Union in April 2023. It was approved for use in the United States in August 2023, based on the Phase 3 MAGNITUDE study.
