= Adosopine =

Names
- Preferred IUPAC name N-(5-Methyl-6,11-dioxo-6,11-dihydro-5H-dibenzo[b,e]azepin-10-yl)acetamide
- Other names Adosupine

Identifiers
CAS Number	88124-26-9
3D model (JSmol)	Interactive image
ChEMBL	ChEMBL2103994
ChemSpider	59096
ECHA InfoCard	100.081.230
PubChem CID	65661
UNII	OKB1O47Q6F
CompTox Dashboard (EPA)	DTXSID50868995
- InChI: InChI=1S/C17H14N2O3/c1-10(20)18-13-8-5-7-12-15(13)16(21)11-6-3-4-9-14(11)19(2)17(12)22/h3-9H,1-2H3,(H,18,20) Key: KLSKLNWJEDXFSD-UHFFFAOYSA-N; InChI=1/C17H14N2O3/c1-10(20)18-13-8-5-7-12-15(13)16(21)11-6-3-4-9-14(11)19(2)17(12)22/h3-9H,1-2H3,(H,18,20) Key: KLSKLNWJEDXFSD-UHFFFAOYAV
- SMILES: CC(=O)NC1=CC=CC2=C1C(=O)C3=CC=CC=C3N(C2=O)C

Properties
Chemical formula	C_{17}H_{14}N_{2}O_{3}
Molar mass	294.310 g·mol^{−1}
- Except where otherwise noted, data are given for materials in their standard state (at 25 °C [77 °F], 100 kPa). Infobox references

Adosopine is a dibenzoazepine drug that has been studied for the treatment of urinary incontinence.
