= Aganodine =

Names
- IUPAC name 2-(4,7-Dichloro-1,3-dihydroisoindol-2-yl)guanidine

Identifiers
CAS Number	86696-87-9
3D model (JSmol)	Interactive image
ChEMBL	ChEMBL2105912
ChemSpider	154051
PubChem CID	176878
UNII	670P9AQR46
CompTox Dashboard (EPA)	DTXSID60235775
- InChI: InChI=1S/C9H10Cl2N4/c10-7-1-2-8(11)6-4-15(3-5(6)7)14-9(12)13/h1-2H,3-4H2,(H4,12,13,14) Key: DFKHOVYSCCPSHR-UHFFFAOYSA-N
- SMILES: C1C2=C(C=CC(=C2CN1N=C(N)N)Cl)Cl

Properties
Chemical formula	C_{9}H_{10}Cl_{2}N_{4}
Molar mass	245.109
- Except where otherwise noted, data are given for materials in their standard state (at 25 °C [77 °F], 100 kPa). Infobox references

Aganodine is a guanidine that activates presynaptic imidazoline receptors. Through its agonism at imidazoline receptors, aganodine inhibits the presynaptic release of norepinephrine.
