= Afurolol =

Chemical compound

Clinical data
- ATC code: none

Identifiers
- IUPAC name: 7-[3-(tert-Butylamino)-2-hydroxy-propoxy]-3H-isobenzofuran-1-one
- CAS Number: 65776-67-2
- PubChem CID: 176877
- ChemSpider: 154050
- UNII: WQ1WRV49R9
- ChEMBL: ChEMBL1742435
- CompTox Dashboard (EPA): DTXSID70867182

Chemical and physical data
- Formula: C_{15}H_{21}NO_{4}
- Molar mass: 279.336 g·mol^{−1}
- 3D model (JSmol): Interactive image
- SMILES: O=C1OCc2cccc(OCC(O)CNC(C)(C)C)c12
- InChI: InChI=1S/C15H21NO4/c1-15(2,3)16-7-11(17)9-19-12-6-4-5-10-8-20-14(18)13(10)12/h4-6,11,16-17H,7-9H2,1-3H3; Key:NFXPPCYKSAAUMQ-UHFFFAOYSA-N

Alfurolol is a beta blocker.
