= 4-Chlorophenoxyacetic acid =

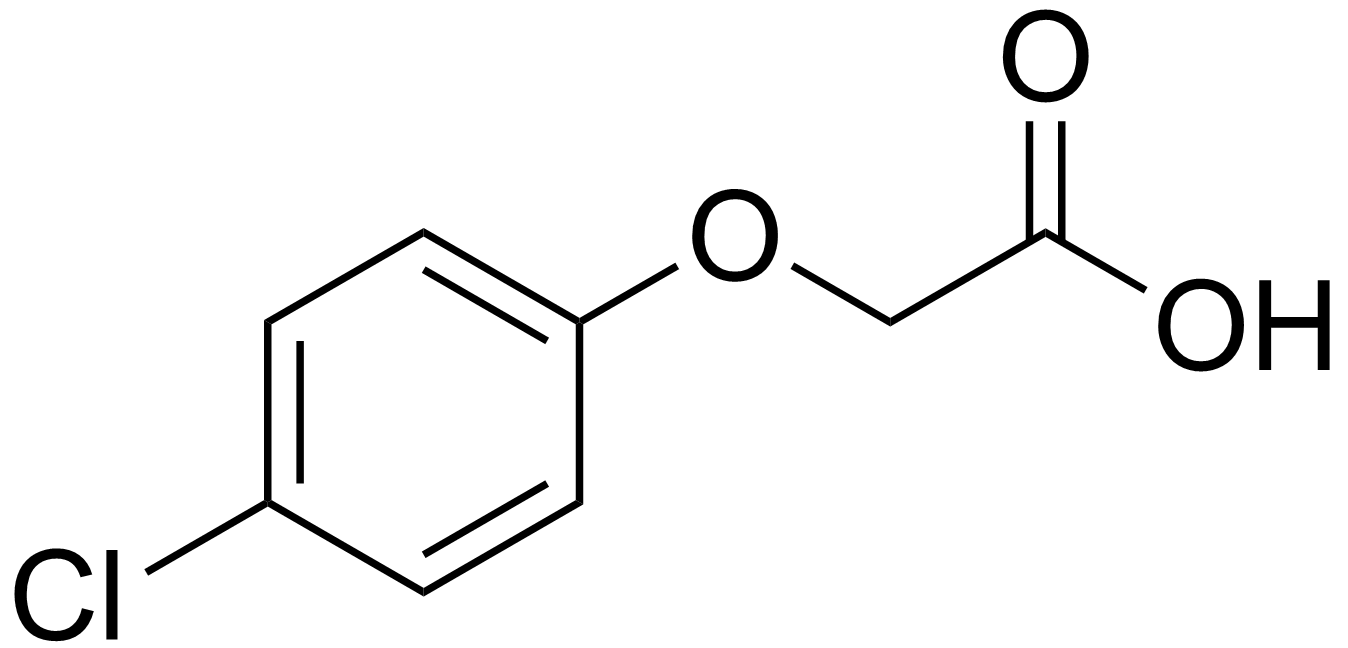

Names
- Preferred IUPAC name (4-Chlorophenoxy)acetic acid
- Other names 2-(4-Chlorophenoxy)acetic acid Parachlorophenoxyacetate; 4-Chlorophenoxyacetate

Identifiers
| CAS Number | 122-88-3 |
| 3D model (JSmol) | Interactive image |
| Abbreviations | pCPA |
| ChEBI | CHEBI:1808 |
| ChEMBL | ChEMBL178018 |
| ChemSpider | 24438 |
| ECHA InfoCard | 100.004.166 |
| KEGG | C07088 |
| PubChem CID | 26229 |
| UNII | 4EMM3U5P3K |
| CompTox Dashboard (EPA) | DTXSID9034282 |
- InChI: InChI=1S/C8H7ClO3/c9-6-1-3-7(4-2-6)12-5-8(10)11/h1-4H,5H2,(H,10,11) Key: SODPIMGUZLOIPE-UHFFFAOYSA-N; InChI=1/C8H7ClO3/c9-6-1-3-7(4-2-6)12-5-8(10)11/h1-4H,5H2,(H,10,11) Key: SODPIMGUZLOIPE-UHFFFAOYAE
- SMILES: Clc1ccc(OCC(=O)O)cc1

Properties
| Chemical formula | C_{8}H_{7}ClO_{3} |
| Molar mass | 186.59 g·mol^{−1} |
- Except where otherwise noted, data are given for materials in their standard state (at 25 °C [77 °F], 100 kPa). verify (what is ?) Infobox references

4-Chlorophenoxyacetic acid or parachlorophenoxyacetate (pCPA) is a synthetic pesticide similar to chemicals in a group of plant hormones called auxins.

A proven use is in the synthesis of Fipexide.
