= CpG oligodeoxynucleotide =

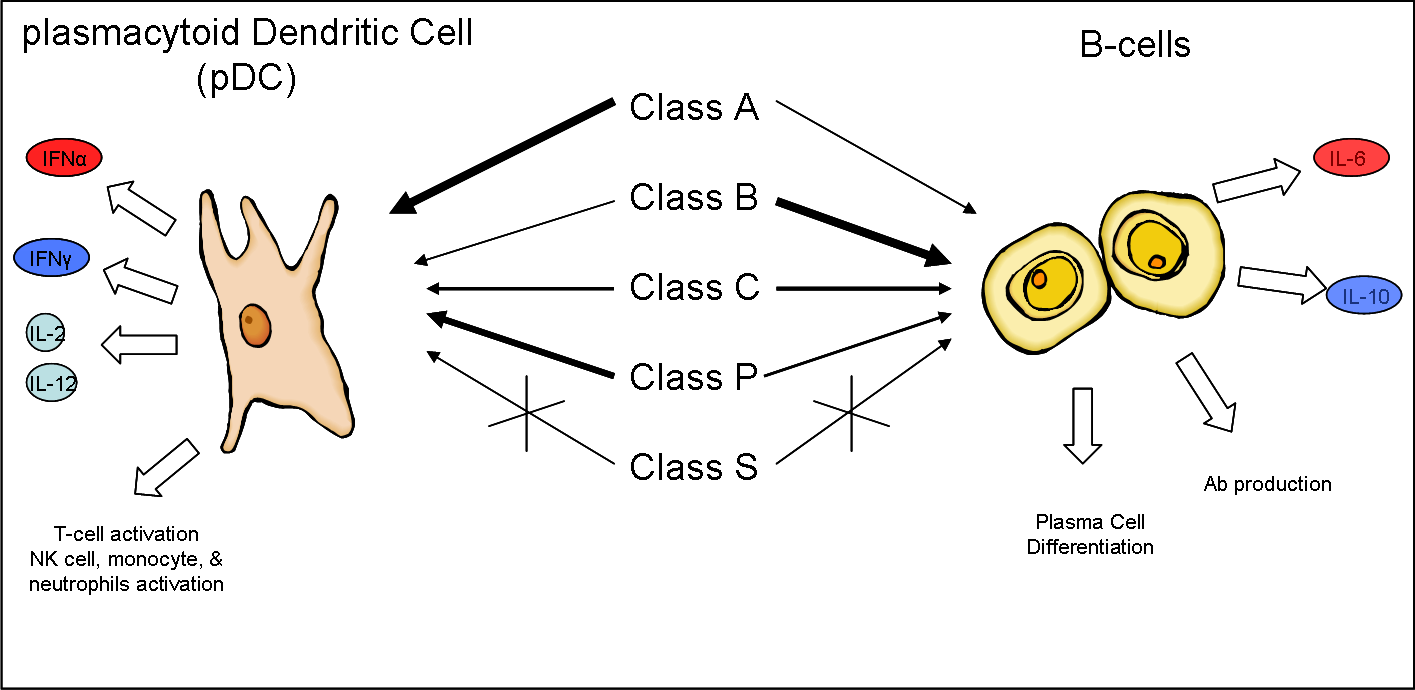
The different classes of ODN elicit different responses in pDC and B cells.

CpG oligodeoxynucleotides (or CpG ODN) are short single-stranded synthetic DNA molecules that contain a cytosine triphosphate deoxynucleotide ("C") followed by a guanine triphosphate deoxynucleotide ("G"). The "p" refers to the phosphodiester link between consecutive nucleotides, although some ODN have a modified phosphorothioate (PS) backbone instead. When these CpG motifs are unmethylated, they act as immunostimulants. CpG motifs are considered pathogen-associated molecular patterns (PAMPs) due to their abundance in microbial genomes but their rarity in vertebrate genomes. The CpG PAMP is recognized by the pattern recognition receptor (PRR) Toll-Like Receptor 9 (TLR9), which is constitutively expressed only in B cells and plasmacytoid dendritic cells (pDCs) in humans and other higher primates.

== History ==
Since 1893, it has been recognized that Coley's toxin, a mixture of bacterial cell lysate, has immunostimulatory properties that could reduce the progression of some carcinomas, but it was not until 1983 that Tokunaga et al. specifically identified bacterial DNA as the underlying component of the lysate that elicited the response. Then, in 1995 Krieg et al. demonstrated that the CpG motif within bacterial DNA was responsible for the immunostimulatory effects and developed synthetic CpG ODN. Since then, synthetic CpG ODN have been the focus of intense research due to the Type I pro-inflammatory response they elicit and their successful use as vaccine adjuvants.

== Structural features ==
Synthetic CpG ODN differ from microbial DNA in that they have a partially or completely phosphorothioated (PS) backbone instead of the typical phosphodiester backbone and a poly G tail at the 3' end, 5' end, or both. PS modification protects the ODN from being degraded by nucleases such as DNase in the body and poly G tail enhances cellular uptake. The poly G tails form intermolecular tetrads that result in high molecular weight aggregates. These aggregates are responsible for the increased activity the poly G sequence impart; not the sequence itself. Numerous sequences have been shown to stimulate TLR9 with variations in the number and location of CpG dimers, as well as the precise base sequences flanking the CpG dimers. This led to the creation of five unofficial classes or categories of CpG ODN based on their sequence, secondary structures, and effect on human peripheral blood mononuclear cells (PBMCs). The five classes are Class A (Type D), Class B (Type K), Class C, and Class P. During the discovery process, the "Classes" were not defined until much later when it became evident that ODN with certain characteristics elicited specific responses. Because of this, most ODN referred to in the literature use numbers (i.e., ODN 2006, ODN 2007, ODN 2216, ODN D35, ODN K3, etc.). The numbers are arbitrary and come from testing large numbers of ODN with slight variations in attempts to find the optimal sequence. In addition, some papers will give different names to previously described ODN, complicating the naming convention even more.

== Class A ==
One of the first Class A ODN, ODN 2216, was described in 2001 by Krug et al. This class of ODN was distinctly different from the previously described Class B ODN (i.e., ODN 2006) in that it stimulated the production of large amounts of Type I interferons, the most important one being IFNα, and induced the maturation of plasmacytoid dendritic cells. Class A ODN are also strong activators of NK cells through indirect cytokine signaling.

Structural features defining Class A ODN:

- The presences of a poly G sequence at the 5' end, the 3' end, or both
- An internal palindrome sequence
- GC dinucleotides contained within the internal palindrome
- A partially PS-modified backbone

Class A ODN typically contain 7 to 10 PS-modified bases at one or both ends that resist degradation by nucleases and increase the longevity of the ODN. The above rules strictly define the class, but variability of the sequence within these "rules" is possible. It should also be noted that changes to the sequence will affect the magnitude of the response. For example, the internal palindrome sequence can be 4 to 8 base pairs in length and vary in the order of bases, however the pattern, 5'-Pu Pu CG Pu Py CG Py Py-3', was found to be the most active when compared to several other sequences. The poly G tail found at either end of the DNA strand can vary in length and even number (Type D only have a poly G sequence on the 3'end), but its presence is critical to the activity of the molecule.

== Class B ==
Krieg et al. was the first to describe Class B ODN in 1995. Class B ODN (i.e. ODN 2007) are strong stimulators of human B cell and monocyte maturation. They also stimulate the maturation of pDC but to a lesser extent than Class A ODN and very small amounts of IFNα.

Structural features defining Class B ODN:

- One or more 6mer CpG motif 5'-Pu Py C G Py Pu-3'
- A fully phosphorothioated (PS-modified) backbone
- Generally 18 to 28 nucleotides in length

The strongest ODN in this class have three 6mer sequences. B ODN have been studied extensively as therapeutic agents because of their ability to induce a strong humoral immune response, making them ideal as a vaccine adjuvant.
