= Adarotene =

Names
- Preferred IUPAC name (2E)-3-[3′-(Adamantan-1-yl)-4′-hydroxy[1,1′-biphenyl]-4-yl]prop-2-enoic acid
- Other names 3-(4'-Hydroxy-3'-adamantylbiphenyl-4-yl)acrylic acid

Identifiers
CAS Number	496868-77-0
3D model (JSmol)	Interactive image
ChemSpider	25069675
PubChem CID	9864378
UNII	W6SU73VG8H
CompTox Dashboard (EPA)	DTXSID9040390
- InChI: InChI=1S/C25H26O3/c26-23-7-6-21(20-4-1-16(2-5-20)3-8-24(27)28)12-22(23)25-13-17-9-18(14-25)11-19(10-17)15-25/h1-8,12,17-19,26H,9-11,13-15H2,(H,27,28)/b8-3+/t17-,18+,19-,25- Key: QAWBIEIZDDIEMW-SOKLTXMDSA-N; InChI=1/C25H26O3/c26-23-7-6-21(20-4-1-16(2-5-20)3-8-24(27)28)12-22(23)25-13-17-9-18(14-25)11-19(10-17)15-25/h1-8,12,17-19,26H,9-11,13-15H2,(H,27,28)/b8-3+/t17-,18+,19-,25- Key: QAWBIEIZDDIEMW-SOKLTXMDBA
- SMILES: c1c(ccc(c1)c2cc(c(cc2)O)[C@@]34C[C@H]5C[C@@H](C3)C[C@@H](C4)C5)/C=C/C(=O)O

Properties
Chemical formula	C_{25}H_{26}O_{3}
Molar mass	374.480 g·mol^{−1}
- Except where otherwise noted, data are given for materials in their standard state (at 25 °C [77 °F], 100 kPa). Infobox references

Adarotene is a bioactive retinoid.
