= Talopram =

Chemical compound

Clinical data
- ATC code: none

Identifiers
- IUPAC name: 3-(3,3-dimethyl-1-phenyl-isobenzofuran-1-yl)-N-methyl-propan-1-amine
- CAS Number: 7182-51-6
- PubChem CID: 23573
- ChemSpider: 22042
- UNII: 5PY881HC79
- CompTox Dashboard (EPA): DTXSID10864019

Chemical and physical data
- Formula: C_{20}H_{25}NO
- Molar mass: 295.426 g·mol^{−1}
- 3D model (JSmol): Interactive image
- SMILES: CC1(C2=CC=CC=C2C(O1)(CCCNC)C3=CC=CC=C3)C

Talopram (Lu 3-010), also known as phthalapromine, is a selective norepinephrine reuptake inhibitor (NRI) which was researched for the management of depression in the 1960s and 1970s but was never commercialized. Along with talsupram, talopram is structurally related to the selective serotonin reuptake inhibitor (SSRI) citalopram, as well as to melitracen:

In 1971, the company hired Klaus Bøgesø as a medicinal chemist. Over the years Bøgesø turned out to have a Midas touch at the game of drug hunting, creating more molecules that made it to the market than almost any other medicinal chemist in the field. The challenge facing him in 1971 following his recruitment was to produce a selective norepinephrine reuptake inhibitor. Like other companies at the time, Lundbeck had little interest in an SSRI. Bøgesø began from an accident in the laboratory. Trying to create a derivative of their norepinephrine reuptake inhibiting antidepressant melitracen, Lundbeck chemists accidentally produced a new chemical — a phenylphthalene. Against all the odds, just like melitracen, this was also a selective norepinephrine reuptake inhibitor. Two potential antidepressants came out of this — talopram and tasulopram, which were pressed into clinical trials. Both however turned out to be energizing, and in a number of cases there were suicide attempts. The fact that there were suicide attempts appeared to confirm another proposal of Paul Kielholz, that activating antidepressants might lead to suicide. Lundbeck's experience suggested that norepinephrine reuptake inhibitors were likely to lead to just this problem. Lundbeck retreated, scared. If norepinephrine reuptake inhibitors were likely to trigger suicide, the greatest hazard of an antidepressant, then Kielholz's view suggested that an SSRI would be less likely to lead to suicide. Bøgesø's job was to see whether the new series of drugs could be converted into a series of SSRIs. Following a lead from Carlsson on how to do this, he converted talopram into citalopram, the most selective serotonin reuptake inhibitor to come to the market.

== Synthesis ==
An unexpected/fortuitous rearrangement product in the synthesis of litracen is what led to talopram.

== See also ==
- Talsupram (tasulopram)
- Amedalin
- Daledalin
- U.S. patent 3,467,675, 1969 (#15).
- Original literature
- Prindamine (21489-22-5)
