= C19H23NO3 =

The molecular formula C_{19}H_{23}NO_{3} (molar mass: 313.39 g/mol) may refer to:

- Oxyfedrine, a vasodilator
- Esreboxetine
- Ethylmorphine
- Mavoglurant
- Reboxetine
