= Edivoxetine =

Chemical compound

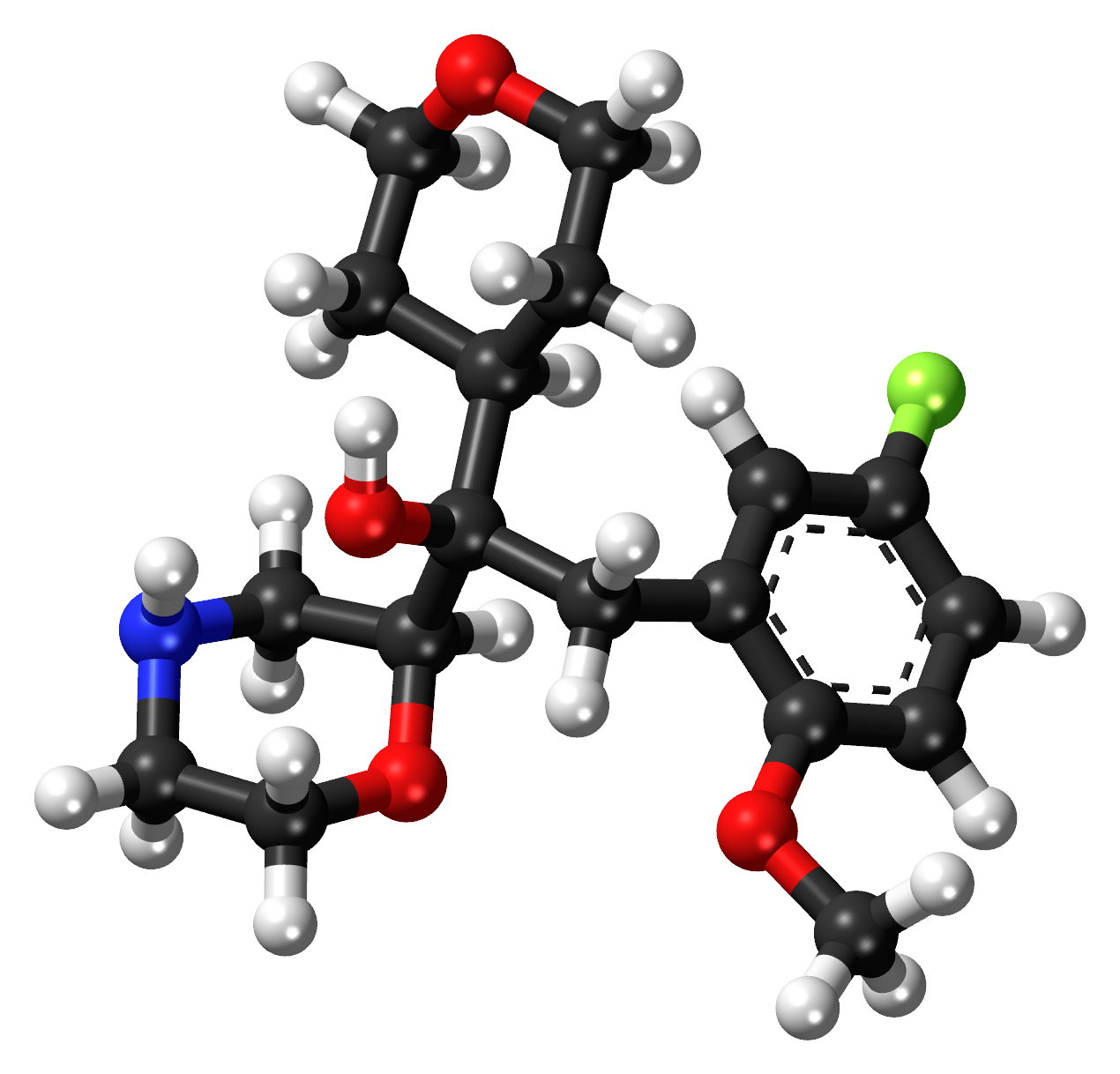

Clinical data
- ATC code: None

Legal status
- Legal status: Development terminated

Identifiers
- IUPAC name: (1R)-2-(5-fluoro-2-methoxyphenyl)-1-[(2S)-morpholin-2-yl]-1-(tetrahydro-2H-pyran-4-yl)ethanol
- CAS Number: 1194508-25-2 1194374-05-4 (hydrochloride)
- PubChem CID: 11186829
- ChemSpider: 9361913
- UNII: 3W9N3F4JOO
- KEGG: D09890
- CompTox Dashboard (EPA): DTXSID70152464

Chemical and physical data
- Formula: C_{18}H_{26}FNO_{4}
- Molar mass: 339.407 g·mol^{−1}
- 3D model (JSmol): Interactive image
- SMILES: COC1=C(C=C(C=C1)F)C[C@]([C@@H]2CNCCO2)(C3CCOCC3)O
- InChI: InChI=1S/C18H26FNO4/c1-22-16-3-2-15(19)10-13(16)11-18(21,14-4-7-23-8-5-14)17-12-20-6-9-24-17/h2-3,10,14,17,20-21H,4-9,11-12H2,1H3/t17-,18+/m0/s1; Key:CPBHSHYQQLFAPW-ZWKOTPCHSA-N

Edivoxetine (INN; code name LY-2216684) is a drug which acts as a selective norepinephrine reuptake inhibitor and was under development by Eli Lilly for attention-deficit disorder (ADD) and as an antidepressant treatment. It was in phase III clinical trials in 2012 for major depressive disorder, but failed to get approval.

== Effectiveness ==
In a study published in 2010, edivoxetine succeeded to prove superiority over placebo, as measured by Hamilton Depression Rating Scale. However, effectiveness could be observed using the Self-Rated Quick Inventory of Depressive Symptomatology.

In a study published in 2011, using the Montgomery–Åsberg Depression Rating Scale and the Sheehan Disability Scale, edivoxetine showed superiority over placebo, with higher response and remission rates.

In December 2013, Eli Lilly announced that the clinical development of edivoxetine will be stopped due to lack of efficacy compared to SSRI alone in three separate clinical trials.

== Side effects ==
Side effects significantly associated with edivoxetine are headache, nausea, constipation, dry mouth and insomnia.

The above-mentioned studies report increases of the cardiac rhythm, and one also increases of diastolic and systolic blood pressures.

== See also ==
- Esreboxetine
