= C15H17ClN2O2 =

The molecular formula C_{15}H_{17}ClN_{2}O_{2} (molar mass: 292.76 g/mol) may refer to:

- Climbazole
- Lortalamine (LM-1404)
