= Norepinephrine reuptake inhibitor =

Medications that increase norepinephrine

- Drug class
- Synonyms: NRI; NERI; Noradrenaline reuptake inhibitor; Adrenergic reuptake inhibitor

External links
- MeSH: D018759

Legal status

Norepinephrine

Epinephrine

A norepinephrine reuptake inhibitor (NRI), also known as a noradrenaline reuptake inhibitor or adrenergic reuptake inhibitor, is a type of drug that acts as a reuptake inhibitor for the neurotransmitters norepinephrine (noradrenaline) and epinephrine (adrenaline) by blocking the action of the norepinephrine transporter (NET). This in turn leads to increased extracellular concentrations of norepinephrine and epinephrine and therefore can increase adrenergic neurotransmission.

A closely related type of drug is a norepinephrine releasing agent (NRA).

== Medical use ==
NRIs are commonly used in the treatment of conditions like ADHD and narcolepsy due to their psychostimulant effects and in obesity due to their appetite suppressant effects. They are also frequently used as antidepressants for the treatment of major depressive disorder, anxiety and panic disorder. Additionally, many addictive substances such as cocaine and methylphenidate possess NRI activity, though NRIs without combined dopamine reuptake inhibitor (DRI) properties are not significantly rewarding and hence are considered to have negligible potential for addiction. However, norepinephrine has been implicated as acting synergistically with dopamine when actions on the two neurotransmitters are combined (e.g., in the case of NDRIs) to produce rewarding effects in psychostimulant addictive substances.

=== Depression ===
A meta analysis published in BMJ in 2011 concluded that the selective NRI reboxetine is indistinguishable from placebo in the treatment of depression. A second review by the European Medicines Agency concluded that reboxetine was significantly more effective than placebo, and that its risk/benefit ratio was positive. The latter review, also examined the efficacy of reboxetine as a function of baseline depression, and concluded that it was effective in severe depression and panic disorder but did not show effects significantly superior to placebo in mild depression.

== Comparison ==
Comparison of selected norepinephrine reuptake inhibitors (NRIs)
NRI	Brand name	Indication	Time to peak	Half-life	Metabolism	Selective?
Ampreloxetine	TD-9855^{a}	Orthostatic hypotension^{a}	6–12 hours	30–40 hours	CYP1A2	No^{b}
Atomoxetine	Strattera	ADHD	1–2 hours	5 hours	CYP2D6	Yes
Bupropion	Wellbutrin, Zyban	Depression, smoking, weight loss	1.5 hours	11–37 hours^{c}	CYP2B6	No^{d}
Desipramine	Norpramin	Depression	5 hours	12–30 hours	CYP2D6	Yes
Reboxetine	Edronax	Depression	~2 hours	12–13 hours	CYP3A4	Yes
Viloxazine	Vivalan, Qelbree	Depression, ADHD	1.5–5 hours^{e}	2–7 hours^{f}	CYP3A4	Yes
Footnotes: ^{a} = Ampreloxetine is not yet approved. ^{b} = Ampreloxetine is also a weaker SRI. ^{c} = Bupropion is a prodrug, with its active metabolites having half-lives of 15–37 hours. ^{d} = Bupropion is an atypical NDRI, a nAChR NAM, and other actions. ^{e} = Viloxazine's T_{max} is 1.5 hours for IR and 5 hours for ER. ^{f} = Viloxazine's t_{1/2} is 2–5 hours for IR and 7 hours for ER.

== List of selective NRIs ==
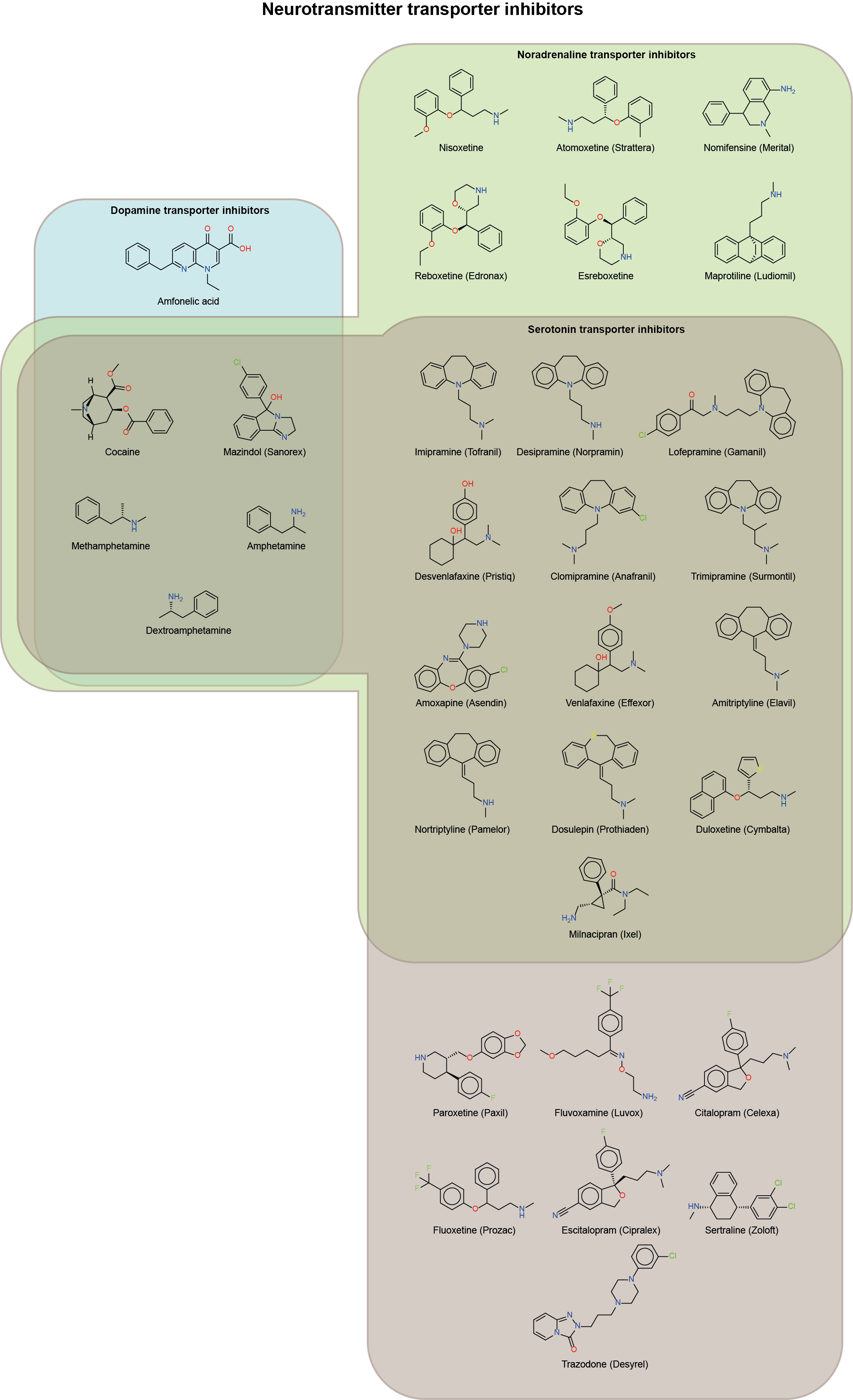
Neurotransmitter transporter inhibitors Noradrenaline (norepinephrine) transporter inhibitors

Many NRIs exist, including the following:

- Selective norepinephrine reuptake inhibitors
  - Marketed
    - Atomoxetine (Strattera)
    - Reboxetine (Edronax, Vestra)
    - Viloxazine (Qelbree, Vivalan) – but also has some other weaker activities
  - Never marketed
    - Amedalin (UK-3540-1)
    - Daledalin (UK-3557-15)
    - Edivoxetine (LY-2216684)
    - Esreboxetine (AXS-14; PNU-165442G)
    - Lortalamine (LM-1404)
    - Nisoxetine (LY-94,939)
    - Talopram (tasulopram) (Lu 3–010)
    - Talsupram (Lu 5–005)
    - Tandamine (AY-23,946)
- NRIs with activity at other sites
  - Marketed
    - Amezinium metilsulfate (Regulton)
    - Bupropion (Wellbutrin, Zyban)
    - Desipramine (Norpramin)
    - Maprotiline (Ludiomil)
    - Nortriptyline (Pamelor)
    - Protriptyline (Vivactil)
    - Tapentadol (Nucynta)
    - Teniloxazine (Lucelan, Metatone)
  - Never marketed
    - Ampreloxetine (TD-9855)
    - Ciclazindol (Wy-23,409)
    - CP-39,332
    - Manifaxine (GW-320,659)
    - Radafaxine (GW-353,162)

Note: Only NRIs selective for the NET greater than the other two monoamine transporters (MATs) are listed here. For a list of NRIs that act at multiple MATs, see the other monoamine reuptake inhibitor pages such as NDRI, SNRI, SRI and SNDRI.

== See also ==
- List of antidepressants
- Monoamine reuptake inhibitor
- Beta blocker, similar type of drugs used to block epinephrine and norepinephrine beta receptors
- List of adrenergic drugs
