= Selective norepinephrine reuptake inhibitor =

Drug class

Selective norepinephrine reuptake inhibitors (sNRIs) are a class of drugs that have been marketed as antidepressants and are used for various mental disorders, mainly depression and attention deficit hyperactivity disorder (ADHD). The norepinephrine transporter (NET) serves as the fundamental mechanism for the inactivation of noradrenergic signaling because of the NET termination in the reuptake of norepinephrine (NE). The selectivity and mechanism of action for the NRI drugs remain mostly unresolved and, to date, only a limited number of NRI-selective inhibitors are available. The first commercially available selective NRI was the drug viloxazine (Qelbree), developed as an antidepressant but later marketed as a treatment for ADHD. Reboxetine (Edronax) was developed as a first-line therapy for major depressive disorder. Atomoxetine (Strattera) is another potent and selective NRI which is also effective and well-tolerated for the treatment of ADHD in adults, particularly for those patients at risk of substance abuse.

== Medical uses ==
- Atomoxetine is sold under the brand name Strattera and was first approved for medical use in the United States in 2002. Its indication is for the treatment of attention deficit hyperactivity disorder (ADHD) in children over 6 years of age, adolescents and adults. Atomoxetine selectively inhibits norepinephrine reuptake by blocking the presynaptic norepinephrine transporter (NET) in the brain. Research has suggested that it also inhibits the reuptake of serotonin by binding to the selective serotonin transporter. However it is not known whether the therapeutic effects of atomoxetine is due to its blockage of the NET or both norepinephrine- and serotonin transporters.
- Reboxetine, sold under the brand name Edronax, is a selective norepinephrine reuptake inhibitor and acts by binding to the NET and blocking the reuptake of norepinephrine in the extracellular fluids. Its indication is for acute treatment of depression or major depression disorder. Reboxetine was first approved for marketing in Europe in 1997, however, in the United States its application for approval was rejected.

Medication	Brand name	Medical uses	Introduced	Chemical structure
Atomoxetine	Strattera	Attention deficit hyperactivity disorder (ADHD), Cognitive disengagement syndrome (CDS)	2002	Atomoxetine structure
Reboxetine	Edronax	Major depressive disorder	1997	Reboxetine structure
Viloxazine	Qelbree	Attention deficit hyperactivity disorder (ADHD), Depression	1974	Viloxazine structure

== Adverse effects ==
=== Side effects ===
Selective NRIs are generally well tolerated but the most common side effects reported are headache, dry mouth, abdominal pain, loss of appetite, nausea, vomiting, and drowsiness. An increase in heart rate and blood pressure have been reported but are usually not clinically important. Sexual adverse effects are mostly related to erectile dysfunction and decreased libido, but they are significantly less common than with serotonergic drugs. Other side effects are urinary retention, constipation, sweating and insomnia. What can be considered serious side effects are thoughts of suicide, aggressiveness and hallucinations.

=== Interactions ===
If people are using sNRI drugs they should not take MAO inhibitors at the same time. That can increase the plasma concentration of NRIs in the body.

Beware of taking atomoxetine in combination with:

1. CYP2D6 inhibitors (e.g., fluoxetine, paroxetine and quinidine) can increase exposure for atomoxetine and it can also increase atomoxetine steady-state plasma concentration.
2. Antihypertensive drugs because it can possibly increase the blood pressure
3. β2-agonist e.g. albuterol because it may increase the efficacy of albuterol on the cardiovascular system.
4. Medicines that affect norepinephrine (e.g. venlafaxine, imipramine, mirtazapine) should be used with caution when administered with atomoxetine due to possible synergy or synergistic effects on pharmacodynamic effects.

Beware of taking reboxetine in combination with:

1. Antifungals, e.g. ketoconazole.
2. Antibiotics, e.g. erythromycin, rifampicin.
3. Ergot derivatives used to treat migraine or Parkinson's disease may cause an increase in blood pressure.
4. Any potassium-depleting diuretics (medicines for eliminating water), e.g. thiazides.
5. Carbamazepine and phenobarbital, medicines used to control fits or seizures.
6. Herbal medicines that contain St. John's Wort.

=== Contraindications ===
A few contraindications should be taken into account for atomoxetine. The first one is hypersensitivity; patients known to be hypersensitive to atomoxetine or other constituents of the product should avoid using it. MAO inhibitors (MAOI) should also be taken into account for contraindications. Atomoxetine should not be taken within 2 weeks after discontinuing an MAOI or completely avoid taking MAOI. The same applies to treatment with an MAOI, that it should not be initiated within 2 weeks after discontinuing atomoxetine. Serious and sometimes fatal reactions may occur when atomoxetine and drugs that affect brain monoamine concentration are given concurrently or in close proximity. Examples of reactions are hyperthermia, inflexibility, myoclonus and altered mental states that include extreme agitation, possibly progressing to delirium and coma. Increased risk of mydriasis was associated with Strattera use in clinical trials. Therefore, the use of Strattera is not recommended in patients with narrow angle glaucoma. Patients with pheochromocytoma or a history of pheochromocytoma should not take Strattera because serious reactions (elevated blood pressure and tachyarrhythmia) have been reported in patients who received Strattera. Last but not least, patients with severe cardiac or vascular disorders should not be using Strattera.

The only contraindication that is reported in the IMB Micromedex database is prior hypersensitivity to the active compound, reboxetine.

== Pharmacology ==
=== Role of norepinephrine ===
Norepinephrine (NE), also known as noradrenaline, is a neurotransmitter that is released predominantly from the ends of sympathetic nerve fibers. The sympathetic nervous system is stimulated in fearful situations and elicits the fight-or-flight response both in animals and humans. This stimulus causes the release of catecholamines such as norepinephrine. The chemical class of catecholamines has positive chronotropic, inotropic and dromotropic effects which lead to increased heart rate, blood pressure, and cardiac output. NE is one of the crucial neurotransmitters in the central nervous system (CNS) and plays an important role in regulating blood pressure, energy metabolism and controlling flexor muscles. The substance has involvement in sleep and mood regulation, expression of behavior and the general degree of alertness and arousal. In the face of a threat, whether it's real or perceived, NE being the most prominent receptor modulator activates behavioral adaptions to maintain homeostasis. The physiological responses in these threatening situation creates emotions of stress and acute anxiety. Responses such as dilatation of bronchioles and pupils, increased heart rate and kidney renin secretion, constricted blood vessels and inhibited peristalsis. Norepinephrine is biosynthesized from the amino acid precursor tyrosine and then is sequentially hydroxylated to dihydroxyphenylalanine, also known as Dopa. Decarboxylation on Dopa generates the neurotransmitter dopamine, afterward when hydroxylated it produces norepinephrine.

=== Role of norepinephrine transporter (NET) ===
Approximately 90% of released NE from the sympathetic nerve fibers is taken up again by postganglionic adrenergic neurons through the protein NET. The reuptake of NE is either repackaged into vesicles or degraded by the enzyme monoamine oxidase (MAO). The NET is located in the plasma membrane of noradrenergic neurons and serves as the fundamental mechanism by terminating the biological effects of NE in the synapse. The NE inactivation process, when taken up by the NET, is crucial in preventing too much increase in the NE concentration in the synaptic cleft. The reuptake of NE is competitive with various naturally occurring amines and drugs.

=== Mechanism of action ===
NET is a target for drugs, that are potent and selective or mixed NET inhibitors (e.g. atomoxetine and reboxetine), named NRI, have been successfully developed to treat various mental disorders, but unfortunately also drugs of abuse (e.g. cocaine). The NRI drugs used medically for mental disorders include attention-deficit hyperactivity disorder (ADHD), depression, anxiety disorders, mood disorders, personality disorders, bipolar disorder, psychosexual disorders and schizophrenia. NRI drugs bind to the NET and inhibit the reuptake of NE. These drugs therefore increase the availability of NE for binding to postsynaptic receptors that regulate adrenergic neurotransmission. Selective NRIs blocks only the monoamine transporter NET, excluding the other two monoamine transporters (DAT and SERT) for dopamine and serotonin. Because if the NRI drug affects those other monoamine transporters they would be called nonselective inhibitors. However, the selectivity and mechanism of action for the NRI drugs remain unknown and, to date, only a very limited number of NRI-selective inhibitors are available. Research has shown that these new ligands vary both in the selectivity and potency at each of these three monoamine transporter sites (NET, DAT and SERT). However, those ligands may be of value in clarifying the pharmacological mechanisms, and in the discovery of new selective NRI drugs with fewer side effects.

=== Pharmacokinetics ===
Drug	Bioavailability	Protein binding	t_{max} (hours)	t_{1/2} (hours)
Atomoxetine	63-94%	98%	1	4,5-19
Reboxetine	94%	96-97%	2	12–12,5
Viloxazine	ER relative to IR: 88%	76-82%	ER: ~5 (3-9)	IR: 2-5 ER: 7 ± 4.7

- t_{max}: Time to achieve a maximum plasma concentration
- t_{1/2}: Biological half-life

Atomoxetine

The pharmacokinetics of atomoxetine are similar in children, teenagers and adults. Pharmacokinetics of atomoxetine has not been studied in children younger than 6 years old. Pharmacokinetic studies have shown that atomoxetine capsules and oral solutions are equivalent. Atomoxetine is very water soluble so it absorbed rapidly and completely after oral administration. Atomoxetine reaches C_{max} 1 to 2 hours after administration. The bioavailability of atomoxetine after oral administration is 63-94%, it is dependent on individual differences in the first-pass metabolism. Atomoxetine is widely distributed and is highly (98%) bound to plasma proteins, mainly albumin. The volume of distribution for atomoxetine is 0.85 L/kg, with limited partitioning into red blood cells. Atomoxetine is mainly metabolized by the cytochrome P4502D6 (CYP2D6) enzyme system. The main metabolite formed is 4-hydroxyatomoxetine, which glucuronate rapidly. 4-hydroxyatomoxetine is equivalent to atomoxetine but is much lower in plasma. The mean elimination half-life of atomoxetine after oral administration is 3.6 hours in individuals in extensive metabolism and 21 hours in those with a slow metabolism. Atomoxetine is excreted mainly as 4-hydroxyatomoxetin-O-glucoronide with urine.

Reboxetine

If 4 mg of reboxetine is taken orally by a healthy adult, the peak levels can be about 130 ng/mL and are achieved within 2 hours after administration. The administration of reboxetine with food delayed the absorption rate by approximately 2 hours while not affecting the extent of absorption. The absolute bioavailability is approximately 94%. Plasma concentrations of reboxetine fell in one exponential phase (monoexponential) with a half-life of about 12 hours. Steady-state is seen within 5 days. Reboxetine is 97% protein bound in young people and 92% in the elderly and is distributed into total body water. Radioactivity excreted in the urine corresponds to 78% of the dose. Even though the drug is mainly unchanged in blood circulation (70% of total radioactivity, as the area under the concentration curve (AUC)), only about 10% of the dose is excreted unchanged in the urine. Reboxetine is almost fully metabolised after oral administration. The drug is mainly metabolised through o-dealkylation and oxidation of the morpholine ring and hydroxylation of the ethoxyphenoxy ring. In vitro studies indicate that the CYP450(3A4) enzyme is primarily responsible for the metabolism of reboxetine. The drug is available as a racemic compound. The RR enantiomer is 10 times less potent than the SS enantiomer. The SS enantiomer (more potent) has a plasma level that is two times lower than the urinary excretion. Elimination of reboxetine is mainly via hepatic metabolism (by cytochrome P450 3A4) with a mean terminal half-life of about 12 hours. No significant difference was observed in the terminal half-lives of the RR and SS diastereomers. About 10% of the dose of reboxetine is cleared renally.

=== Dosage ===
For adult patients with attention deficit hyperactivity disorder (ADHD), the initial dose of atomoxetine should be 40 mg daily. The dose should be increased after a minimum of 3 days to a target dose of 80 mg daily as a single dose in the morning. The 80 mg/day can also be taken in two divided doses in the morning and late afternoon. After 2–4 weeks the dose may be increased to 100 mg/day but doses over 100 mg/ day are not suggested.

In the use of atomoxetine in children (6 years or older up to 70 kg) with attention-deficit hyperactivity disorder, acute treatment should be started with approximately 0.5 mg/kg orally daily. The dose should be increased after a minimum of 3 days up to approximately 1.2 mg/kg daily (target dose) as a single or two divided doses (in the morning and late afternoon). For children older than 6 years old, over 70 kg, acute treatment should be started with 40 mg/day orally and increased up to 80 mg/day after a minimum of 3 days. The dose can be taken as a single dose in the morning or in two divided doses (in the morning and late afternoon). After 2–4 weeks the dose can be increased to 100 mg/ daily.

In the use of reboxetine for depression, clinical studies have shown that most patients are treated with an initial dose of reboxetine 8 mg/day, most often as a divided dose. Depending upon patient tolerance and need, the dose can be increased up to 10 mg/day. Doses over 12 mg/day are not recommended. Doses should be adjusted in renal failure, hepatic insufficiency and in geriatric patients.

== Structure and function ==
=== Structure activity relationship ===
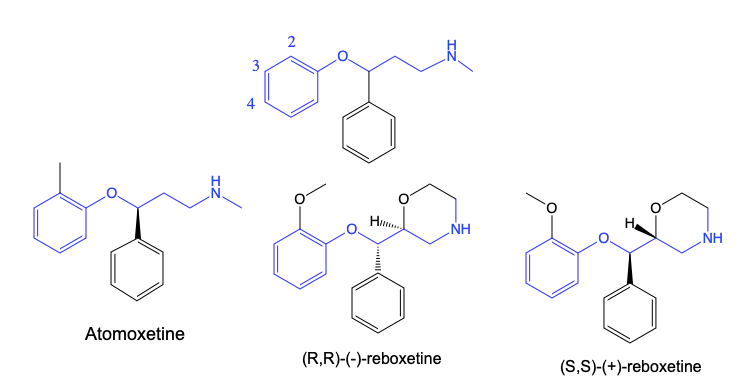
Aryloxy propylamine moiety of atomoxetine and reboxetine

Atomoxetine contains an aryloxy propylamine moiety that has been linked to monoamine reuptake inhibitory activity. It's selectivity to the norepinephrine transporter (NET) is due to its methyl substituent in the 2' position on the phenyl ring. Research has shown that a methyl group in position 2' provides more affinity towards NET than a methoxy group in the same position. The amine group of atomoxetine binds to the amino acids of NET with a salt bridge and hydrogen bonds while the phenyl and methylphenyl groups have hydrophobic interactions. Reboxetine has two chiral centers and the active ingredient is a mixture of the (R,R)-(-)- and (S,S)-(+) enantiomers. Reboxetine, like atomoxetine, contains an aryloxy propylamine moiety and has an ethoxy group in position 2' on the phenyl ring. But the main difference from atomoxetine is the morpholine group instead of a secondary amine. The morpholine group of reboxetine forms a salt bridge and hydrogen bonds with the amino acids of NET. While the phenyl and ethyloxyphenyl groups form hydrophobic interactions.

The aryloxy propylamine moiety is also found in many other monoamine reuptake inhibitors, but the placement of substituents on the phenyl ring determine the selectivity. Compounds with substituents in position 2' have selectivity for NET. Compounds with substituents in position 4' are selective serotonin reuptake inhibitors e.g. fluoxetine and paroxetine. Then there is duloxetine which has a phenyl group attached at positions 2' and 3' and has a similar affinity for both transporters.

== History ==
In the 1950s, major breakthroughs in psychopharmacology occurred around the world. Then throughout the 1960s and 1970s major advances were made in synthesizing and identifying psychoactive drugs which were useful in the treatment of various mental disorders. Here, scientists had realised that these drugs interact with receptors located on neurons that led to changes in neural functioning. The connection was made shortly after the discovery of catecholamines having effects on emotion, relating to depression, and was of wide interest. Discovery was made on the decreased levels of certain neurotransmitters, catecholamines such as norepinephrine, dopamine and serotonin, and their role in the pathogenesis of depression. These past discoveries in psychopharmacology led to the development of antidepressants and a range of drugs with different functions on those neurotransmitters. But a new generation of antidepressants were resulted from the discovery of selective serotonin reuptake inhibitors (SSRIs) (e.g., fluoxetine). Although SSRIs are a group of effective antidepressant drugs with considerably few severe side effects, they are not universally effective and can also have a few unpleasant side effects, such as weight gain, sleep disturbances and anxiety. Pharmacologically and chemically unrelated to SSRIs, the past four decades, norepinephrine has been asserted to play an important, possibly primary, role in the treatment of mental disorders. This was from the notion that depression was primarily due to norepinephrine deficits, partly based on the fact that drugs that relieve depression increase brain norepinephrine levels. To date, a great number of potent and selective and mixed norepinephrine reuptake inhibitors (NRIs) have been marketed as antidepressants. The first commercially available selective norepinephrine reuptake inhibitor (sNRI) was reboxetine (Edronax) and was developed as a first-line therapy for major depressive disorder. The selectivity of reboxetine for the norepinephrine transporter (NET) results in benign side effect profile because the drug is well tolerated. In the laboratories of Chemistry of Farmitalia Carlo Erba (Milan, Italy), reboxetine was synthesized according to the general method described by Melloni et al. In 1993 Kabi Pharmacia, Swedish based pharmaceutical giant, bought Farmitalian and in 2003 Pfizer bought Pharmacia. Atomoxetine (Strattera) is another potent and selective NRI which is also effective and well tolerated treatment for adults with ADHD. This drug was the first ADHD treatment to be specially approved for adult use. Studies showed that atomoxetine is a nonstimulant and carries negligible risk of abuse. This discovery was groundbreaking as a beneficial new treatment option for adults with ADHD, specially those patients at risk of substance abuse.

== See also ==
- Norepinephrine reuptake inhibitor
- Monoamine reuptake inhibitor
