= Talsupram =

Chemical compound

Clinical data
- Routes of administration: Oral
- ATC code: none

Legal status
- Legal status: In general: uncontrolled

Identifiers
- IUPAC name: 3-(3,3-dimethyl-1-phenyl-2-benzothiophen-1-yl)-N-methyl-propan-1-amine
- CAS Number: 21489-20-3
- PubChem CID: 33014
- ChemSpider: 30557
- UNII: C6Z73MW6CR
- CompTox Dashboard (EPA): DTXSID50864992

Chemical and physical data
- Formula: C_{20}H_{25}NS
- Molar mass: 311.49 g·mol^{−1}

Talsupram (Lu 5-005 or Lu 5-003) is a selective norepinephrine reuptake inhibitor (NRI) which was investigated as an antidepressant in the 1960s and 1970s but was never marketed. Along with talopram, it is structurally related to the selective serotonin reuptake inhibitor (SSRI) citalopram.

== See also ==
- Talopram
