= Fluotracen =

Chemical compound

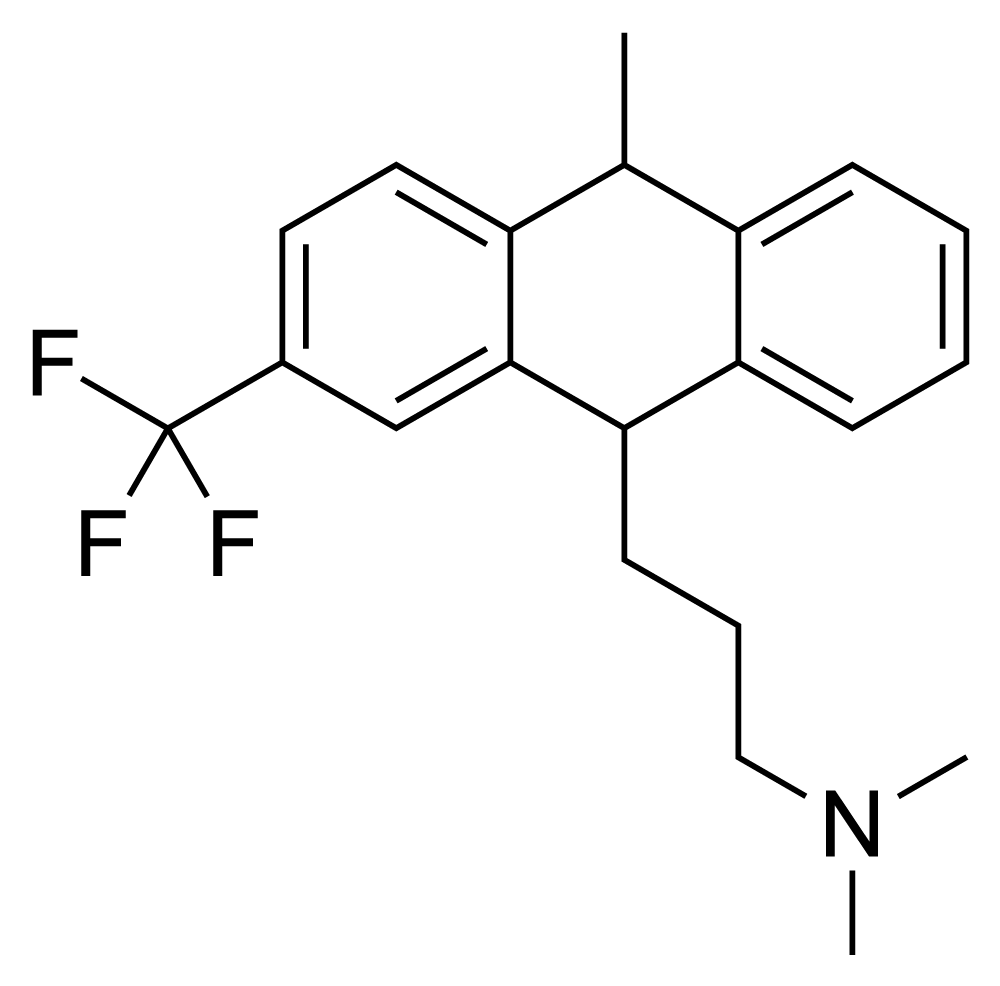

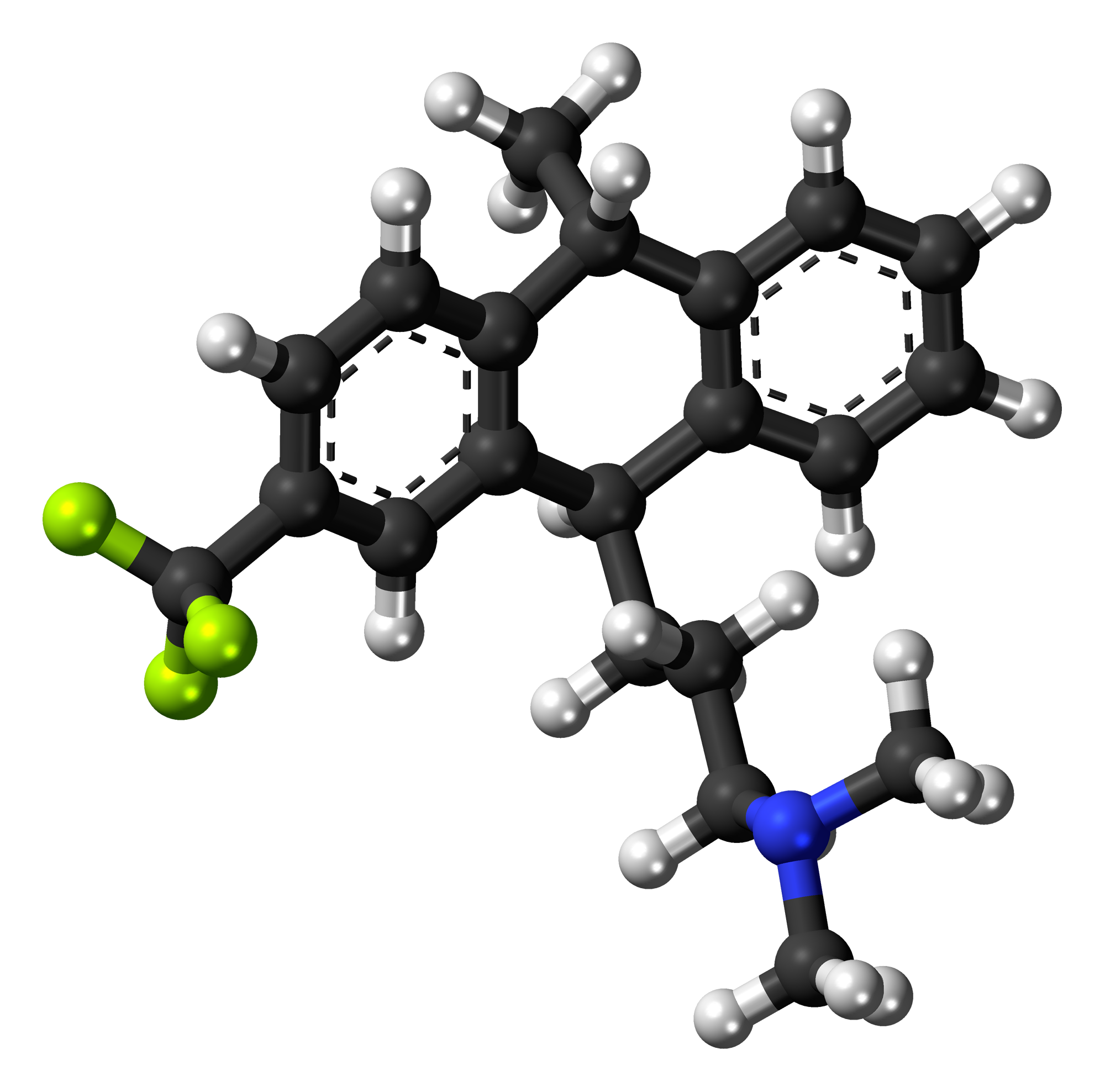

Clinical data
- Routes of administration: Oral
- ATC code: none

Legal status
- Legal status: In general: uncontrolled

Identifiers
- IUPAC name: N,N-dimethyl-3-[10-methyl-2-(trifluoromethyl)-9,10-dihydroanthracen-9-yl]propan-1-amine
- CAS Number: 35764-73-9 57363-14-1 (HCl)
- PubChem CID: 42291
- ChemSpider: 38565
- UNII: 3026WKR55S
- CompTox Dashboard (EPA): DTXSID10865788

Chemical and physical data
- Formula: C_{21}H_{24}F_{3}N
- Molar mass: 347.425 g·mol^{−1}
- 3D model (JSmol): Interactive image
- SMILES: FC(F)(F)c1ccc3c(c1)C(c2ccccc2C3C)CCCN(C)C

Fluotracen (SKF-28,175) is a tricyclic drug which has both antidepressant and antipsychotic activity. This profile of effects is similar to that of related agents like amoxapine, loxapine, and trimipramine which may also be used in the treatment of both depression and psychosis. It was believed that such duality would be advantageous in the treatment of schizophrenia, as depression is often comorbid with the disorder and usual antipsychotics often worsen such symptoms. In any case, however, fluotracen was never marketed.

== See also ==
- Litracen
- Melitracen
