= Ampreloxetine =

Norepinephrine reuptake inhibitor

Clinical data
- Other names: TD-9855
- Drug class: Norepinephrine reuptake inhibitor; Serotonin–norepinephrine reuptake inhibitor

Pharmacokinetic data
- Elimination half-life: 30–40 hours

Identifiers
- IUPAC name: 4-[2-[(2,4,6-trifluorophenoxy)methyl]phenyl]piperidine
- CAS Number: 1227056-84-9
- PubChem CID: 46189893
- DrugBank: DB15348
- ChemSpider: 64853713
- UNII: 19997EZ42I
- KEGG: D11688
- ChEMBL: ChEMBL4297646

Chemical and physical data
- Formula: C_{18}H_{18}F_{3}NO
- Molar mass: 321.343 g·mol^{−1}
- 3D model (JSmol): Interactive image
- SMILES: C1CNCCC1C2=CC=CC=C2COC3=C(C=C(C=C3F)F)F
- InChI: InChI=1S/C18H18F3NO/c19-14-9-16(20)18(17(21)10-14)23-11-13-3-1-2-4-15(13)12-5-7-22-8-6-12/h1-4,9-10,12,22H,5-8,11H2; Key:TZIALEBTHQWNAO-UHFFFAOYSA-N

Ampreloxetine (INN, USAN; developmental code name TD-9855) is a selective norepinephrine reuptake inhibitor (NRI) which is under development for the treatment of symptomatic neurogenic orthostatic hypotension (NOH).

It shows high affinity for both the norepinephrine transporter (NET) and the serotonin transporter (SERT), with 4-fold selectivity for the NET over the SERT, and is thought to act as a dual serotonin–norepinephrine reuptake inhibitor (SNRI) at higher doses.

As of November 2023, ampreloxetine is in phase 3 clinical trials for NOH. The drug was also under development for the treatment of attention deficit hyperactivity disorder (ADHD) and fibromyalgia, but development for these uses was discontinued.

== See also ==
- List of investigational orthostatic intolerance drugs
