= Daledalin =

Chemical compound

Clinical data
- ATC code: None

Identifiers
- IUPAC name: N-Methyl-3-(3-methyl-1-phenyl-2,3-dihydro-1H-indol-3-yl)propan-1-amine
- CAS Number: 22136-27-2 23226-37-1 (tosylate)
- PubChem CID: 31707
- ChemSpider: 29403
- UNII: IT56261A5A
- ChEMBL: ChEMBL2110924
- CompTox Dashboard (EPA): DTXSID00865035

Chemical and physical data
- Formula: C_{19}H_{24}N_{2}
- Molar mass: 280.415 g·mol^{−1}
- 3D model (JSmol): Interactive image
- SMILES: c1cccc2c1C(C)(CN2c3ccccc3)CCCNC

Daledalin (UK-3557-15) is an antidepressant which was synthesized and trialed for depression in the early 1970s, but was never marketed. It is a selective norepinephrine reuptake inhibitor, with no significant effects on the reuptake of serotonin and dopamine, and no antihistamine or anticholinergic properties.

== Synthesis ==
Daledalin can be prepared by the reduction of amedalin with diborane.

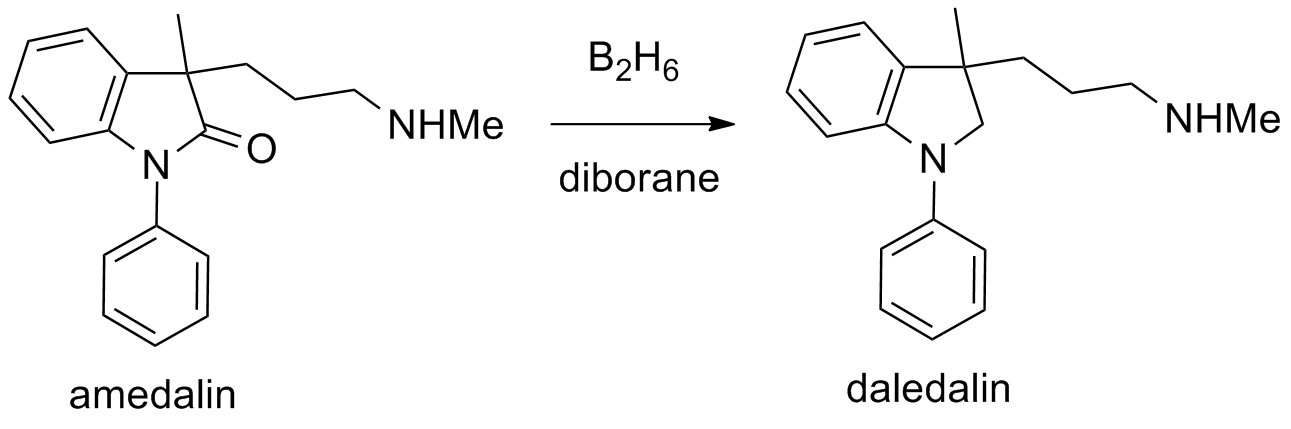
Daledalin synthesis
