= Atomoxetine =

Medication used to treat ADHD

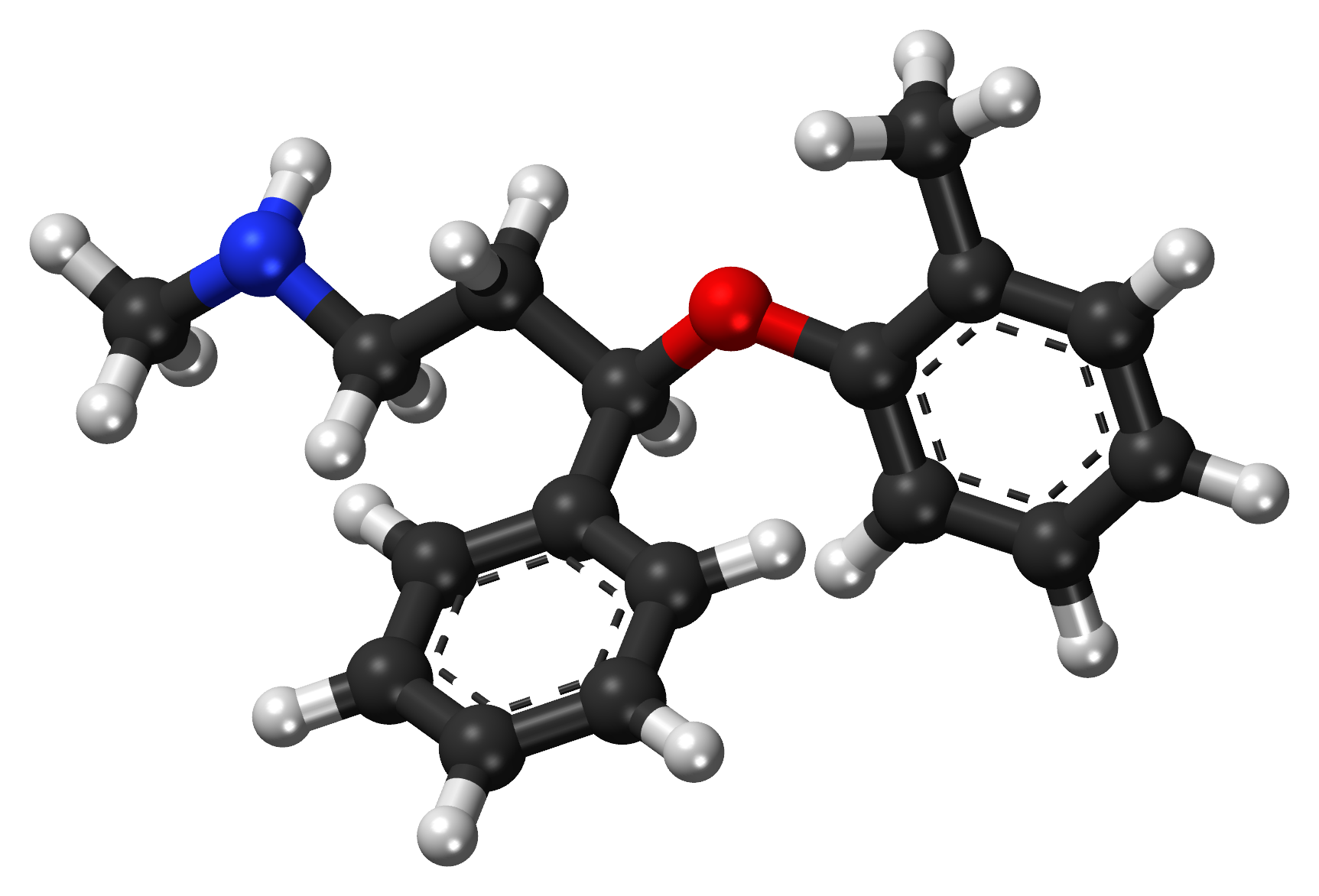

Clinical data
- Trade names: Strattera, others
- Other names: ATX; Tomoxetine; LY-135252; LY135252; (R)-N-Methyl-3-phenyl-3-(o-tolyloxy)propan-1-amine
- AHFS/Drugs.com: Monograph
- MedlinePlus: a603013
- License data: US DailyMed: Atomoxetine
- Pregnancy category: AU: B3
- Routes of administration: Oral
- Drug class: Norepinephrine reuptake inhibitor (NRI)
- ATC code: N06BA09 (WHO)

Legal status
- Legal status: AU: S4 (Prescription only); BR: Class C1 (Other controlled substances); CA: ℞-only; NZ: Prescription only; UK: POM (Prescription only); US: ℞-only; EU: Rx-only

Pharmacokinetic data
- Bioavailability: 2D6 EMs: 94% 2D6 PMs: 63%
- Protein binding: ATX: 98.7% 4-OH-ATX: 66.6% N-DM-ATX: 99.1%
- Metabolism: Liver: ring hydroxylation (CYP2D6, others), benzylic hydroxylation, N-demethylation (CYP2C19), glucuronidation (UGTs)
- Metabolites: • 4-Hydroxyatomoxetine • N-Desmethylatomoxetine • 2-Hydroxymethylatomoxetine • N-Desmethyl-4-hydroxyatomoxetine • Glucuronide conjugates
- Onset of action: 1–2 hours (T_{max})
- Elimination half-life: 2D6 EMs: 4.5–5.3 h 2D6 PMs: 19–22 h
- Excretion: 2D6 EMs: urine (>96%), feces (1–2%); 2D6 PMs: urine (80%), feces (13–22%)

Identifiers
- IUPAC name: (3R)-N-methyl-3-(2-methylphenoxy)-3-phenylpropan-1-amine
- CAS Number: 83015-26-3; as HCl: 82248-59-7
- PubChem CID: 54841; as HCl: 54840
- IUPHAR/BPS: 7118
- DrugBank: DB00289; as HCl: DBSALT001207
- ChemSpider: 49516; as HCl: 49515
- UNII: ASW034S0B8; as HCl: 57WVB6I2W0
- KEGG: D07473; as HCl: D02574
- ChEBI: CHEBI:127342; as HCl: CHEBI:331697
- ChEMBL: ChEMBL641; as HCl: ChEMBL1702
- CompTox Dashboard (EPA): DTXSID9044297
- ECHA InfoCard: 100.120.306

Chemical and physical data
- Formula: C_{17}H_{21}NO
- Molar mass: 255.361 g·mol^{−1}
- 3D model (JSmol): Interactive image
- SMILES: CC1=C(C=CC=C1)O[C@H](CCNC)C2=CC=CC=C2
- InChI: InChI=1S/C17H21NO/c1-14-8-6-7-11-16(14)19-17(12-13-18-2)15-9-4-3-5-10-15/h3-11,17-18H,12-13H2,1-2H3/t17-/m1/s1; Key:VHGCDTVCOLNTBX-QGZVFWFLSA-N

Atomoxetine, sold under the brand name Strattera, is a selective norepinephrine reuptake inhibitor medication used to treat attention deficit hyperactivity disorder (ADHD) and, to a lesser extent, cognitive disengagement syndrome (CDS). It may be used alone or along with psychostimulant medication. It enhances the executive functions of self-motivation, sustained attention, inhibition, working memory, reaction time, and emotional self-regulation. Use of atomoxetine is only recommended for those who are at least six years old. It is taken orally. The effectiveness of atomoxetine is comparable to the commonly prescribed stimulant medication methylphenidate.

Common side effects of atomoxetine include abdominal pain, decreased appetite, nausea, feeling tired, and dizziness. Serious side effects may include angioedema, liver problems, stroke, psychosis, heart problems, suicide, and aggression. There is a lack of data regarding its safety during pregnancy; as of 2019, its safety during pregnancy and for use during breastfeeding is not certain.

It was approved for medical use in the United States in 2002. In 2023, it was the 161st most commonly prescribed medication in the United States, with more than 3 million prescriptions.

== Medical uses ==
=== Attention deficit hyperactivity disorder ===
Atomoxetine is indicated for the treatment of attention deficit hyperactivity disorder (ADHD). It is approved for use in children, adolescents, and adults. However, its efficacy has not been studied in children under six years old. One of the primary differences with the standard stimulant treatments for ADHD is that it has no known misuse potential. Meta-analyses and systematic reviews have found that atomoxetine has comparable efficacy and equal tolerability to methylphenidate in children and adolescents. In adults, efficacy and tolerability are equivalent. The benefits of atomoxetine against ADHD symptoms are dose-dependent until a plateau is reached.

While its efficacy may be less than that of lisdexamfetamine, there is some evidence supporting its use in combination with stimulants. Doctors may prescribe non-stimulants including atomoxetine when a person has bothersome side effects from stimulants; when a stimulant was not effective; in combination with a stimulant to increase effectiveness; when the cost of stimulants is prohibitive; or when there is concern about the misuse potential of stimulants in a patient with a history of substance use disorder.

Atomoxetine, similarly to stimulants, appears to reduce emotional lability associated with ADHD in adults.

Atomoxetine is thought to alleviate ADHD symptoms through norepinephrine reuptake inhibition and by indirectly increasing dopamine levels in the prefrontal cortex, sharing 70–80% of the brain regions with stimulants in its produced effects.

The initial therapeutic effects of atomoxetine usually take 1 to 4 weeks to become apparent. A further 2 to 4 weeks may be required for the full therapeutic effects to be seen. Incrementally increasing response may occur up to 1 year or longer. The maximum recommended total daily dose in children and adolescents is 70 mg and adults is 100 mg.

=== Other uses ===
==== Cognitive disengagement syndrome ====
Atomoxetine may be used to treat cognitive disengagement syndrome (CDS), as multiple randomised controlled clinical trials (RCTs) have found that it is an effective treatment. In contrast, multiple RCTs have shown that it responds poorly to the stimulant medication methylphenidate.

==== Nocturnal enuresis ====
Atomoxetine has been studied in the treatment of nocturnal enuresis in children and is effective for this indication.

==== Excessive sleepiness ====
Atomoxetine has wakefulness-promoting effects and is used off-label in the treatment of excessive sleepiness in for instance narcolepsy.

==== Traumatic brain injury ====
Atomoxetine is sometimes used in the treatment of cognitive impairment and frontal lobe symptoms due to conditions like traumatic brain injury (TBI). It is used to treat ADHD-like symptoms such as sustained attentional problems, disinhibition, lack of arousal, fatigue, and depression, including symptoms from cognitive disengagement syndrome. A 2015 Cochrane review identified only one study of atomoxetine for TBI and found no positive effects. Aside from TBI, atomoxetine was found to be effective in the treatment of akinetic mutism following subarachnoid hemorrhage in a case report.

=== Available forms ===
Atomoxetine is available in the form of oral capsules (10, 18, 25, 40, 60, 80, or 100 mg) and in an oral solution (4 mg/mL). It is taken once or twice daily.

== Contraindications ==
Contraindications of atomoxetine include:

- Any cardiovascular disease including:
  - Moderate to severe hypertension
  - Atrial fibrillation
  - Atrial flutter
  - Ventricular tachycardia
  - Ventricular fibrillation
  - Ventricular flutter
  - Advanced arteriosclerosis
- Severe cardiovascular disorders
- Uncontrolled hyperthyroidism
- Pheochromocytoma or history thereof
- Concomitant treatment with monoamine oxidase inhibitors (MAOIs) (and with at least 2 weeks washout)
- Narrow-angle glaucoma
- Pregnancy and lactation
- Hypersensitivity to atomoxetine or other constituents

However, the FDA label states that in the case of cardiovascular disease, atomoxetine is only contraindicated in the case of severe cardiovascular disease. However, it states that atomoxetine should be used with caution in people with cardiovascular disease. In addition, consideration should be given to not using atomoxetine in people with clinically significant or serious structural cardiac abnormalities, as this may put them at greater risk of cardiovascular complications with atomoxetine.

A precaution or relative contraindication is concomitant use of strong CYP2D6 inhibitors, which may necessitate atomoxetine dose adjustment.

== Side effects ==
Common side effects include abdominal pain, decreased appetite, nausea, erectile dysfunction, feeling tired, dizziness, and urinary retention. Atomoxetine has been found to modestly increase heart rate and blood pressure. A 2020 meta-analysis found that atomoxetine was associated with appetite suppression, weight loss, and hypertension, rating it as a "potentially least preferred agent based on safety" for treating ADHD. The drug can produce insomnia as a side effect, especially in CYP2D6 poor metabolizers, but has less overall risk of insomnia than methylphenidate or amphetamines.

As of 2019, safety in pregnancy and breastfeeding is not clear; a 2018 review stated that, "because of lack of data, the treating physician should consider stopping atomoxetine treatment in women with ADHD during pregnancy."

Serious side effects may include angioedema, liver problems, psychosis, heart problems, suicide, and aggression. Atomoxetine does not appear to increase the risk of stroke in adults nor the risk of sudden death. On the other hand, the FDA label notes that sudden death, stroke, and heart attack have been reported in association with atomoxetine and that such complications may be more likely in people with pre-existing cardiovascular disease. The drug can dramatically increase blood pressure in people with central autonomic failure, even at very low doses. Rarely, atomoxetine can cause drug-induced liver injury or liver failure.

Atomoxetine may increase the likelihood of aggression and hostility in children with ADHD, although such events are rare. The U.S. Food and Drug Administration (FDA) has issued a black box warning for suicidal behavior/ideation. Similar warnings have been issued in Australia. Unlike stimulant medications, atomoxetine does not have misuse liability or the potential to cause withdrawal effects upon abrupt discontinuation.

Atomoxetine has been found to directly inhibit hERG potassium currents with an IC_{50} of 6,300 nM, which has the potential to cause arrhythmia. No substantial QTc interval changes were observed in a clinical study of atomoxetine in CYP2D6 poor metabolizers. However, small changes could not be ruled out, and there was a slight but significant increase in QTc interval with higher atomoxetine concentrations. QT prolongation has been reported with atomoxetine at therapeutic doses and in overdose; it is suggested that atomoxetine not be used with other medications that may prolong the QT interval, concomitantly with CYP2D6 inhibitors, and caution to be used in poor metabolizers.

Unlike α_{2}-adrenergic receptor agonists such as guanfacine and clonidine, atomoxetine's use can be abruptly stopped without significant withdrawal symptoms being observed.

== Overdose ==
Atomoxetine can lead to cardiac complications, with severe overdose requiring intensive medical care to avoid death.

== Interactions ==
Atomoxetine is a substrate for CYP2D6. Concurrent treatment with strong CYP2D6 inhibitors such as bupropion, fluoxetine, paroxetine, and quinidine has been shown to substantially increase atomoxetine exposure, as well as increase N-desmethylatomoxetine levels and decrease 4-hydroxyatomoxetine levels. Bupropion increased atomoxetine exposure by 5.1-fold and decreased 4-hydroxyatomoxetine-O-glucuronide exposure by 1.5-fold. Similarly, paroxetine increased atomoxetine steady-state peak levels by 3.5-fold, total exposure (over 12 hours) by 6.5-fold, and elimination half-life by 2.5-fold. Findings were analogous for fluoxetine and quinidine. CYP2D6 inhibitors do not appear to affect atomoxetine metabolism in CYP2D6 poor metabolizers. Dosage adjustment of atomoxetine may be necessary in people taking strong CYP2D6 inhibitors.

Atomoxetine does not show clinically important inhibition or induction of cytochrome P450 (CYP450) enzymes including CYP1A2, CYP3A, CYP2D6, and CYP2C9. It did not affect the pharmacokinetics of the CYP2D6 substrate desipramine, whereas it increased exposure to the CYP3A4 substrate midazolam by only 15%. Atomoxetine is a moderate to potent inhibitor of P-glycoprotein.

Other notable drug interactions include:

- Antihypertensive agents, due to atomoxetine acting as an indirect sympathomimetic
- Indirect-acting sympathomimetics, such as pseudoephedrine, other norepinephrine reuptake inhibitors (NRIs), or MAOIs
- Direct-acting sympathomimetics, such as phenylephrine or other α_{1}-adrenergic receptor agonists, including vasopressors such as dobutamine or isoprenaline and β_{2}-adrenergic receptor agonists
- Highly plasma protein-bound drugs: atomoxetine has the potential to displace these drugs from plasma proteins which may potentiate their adverse or toxic effects. In vitro, atomoxetine does not affect the plasma protein binding of aspirin, desipramine, diazepam, paroxetine, phenytoin, or warfarin

Drugs affecting gastric pH have no effect on the bioavailability or pharmacokinetics of atomoxetine.

Atomoxetine prevents norepinephrine release induced by amphetamines and has been found to reduce the stimulant, euphoriant, and sympathomimetic effects of dextroamphetamine in humans.

== Pharmacology ==
=== Pharmacodynamics ===
Atomoxetine (and metabolites) activities
Site	ATX	4-OH-ATX	N-DM-ATX
SERT	77	43	ND
NET	5	3	92
DAT	1,451	ND	ND
MOR	>1,000	422 (antagonist?)	ND
DOR	ND	300 (antagonist?)	ND
KOR	>1,000?	95 (partial agonist)	ND
σ_{1}	>1,000	ND	ND
GABA_{A}	200	>30,000	>10,000
NMDA	0.66–3,470^{a}	ND	ND
5-HT_{1A}	>1,000	ND	ND
5-HT_{1B}	>1,000	ND	ND
5-HT_{1D}	>1,000	ND	ND
5-HT_{2}	2,000	1,000	1,700
5-HT_{6}	>1,000	ND	ND
5-HT_{7}	>1,000	ND	ND
α_{1}	11,400	20,000	19,600
α_{2A}	29,800	>30,000	>10,000
β_{1}	18,000	56,100	32,100
M_{1}	>100,000	>100,000	>100,000
M_{2}	>100,000	>100,000	>100,000
D_{1}	>10,000	>10,000	>10,000
D_{2}	>10,000	>10,000	>10,000
H_{1}	12,100	>100,000	>100,000
K_{ir}3.1/3.2	10,900^{b}	ND	ND
K_{ir}3.2	12,400^{b}	ND	ND
K_{ir}3.1/3.4	6,500^{b}	ND	ND
hERG	6,300	20,000	5,710
Notes: Values are K_{i} (nM). The smaller the value, the more avidly the drug binds to the site. All values are for human receptors unless otherwise specified. Footnotes: ^{a} = Rat cortex. ^{b} = Xenopus oocytes. Additional sources:

Atomoxetine inhibits the presynaptic norepinephrine transporter (NET), preventing the reuptake of norepinephrine throughout the brain along with inhibiting the reuptake of dopamine in specific brain regions such as the prefrontal cortex, where dopamine transporter (DAT) expression is minimal. In rats, atomoxetine increased prefrontal cortex catecholamine concentrations without altering dopamine levels in the striatum or nucleus accumbens; in contrast, methylphenidate, a dopamine reuptake inhibitor (DRI), was found to increase prefrontal, striatal, and accumbal dopamine levels to the same degree. In addition to rats, atomoxetine has also been found to induce similar region-specific catecholamine level alteration in mice. Atomoxetine is selective for the NET over many other targets.

Atomoxetine's status as a serotonin transporter (SERT) inhibitor at clinical doses in humans is uncertain. A PET imaging study on rhesus monkeys found that atomoxetine occupied >90% and >85% of neural NET and SERT, respectively. However, both mouse and rat microdialysis studies have failed to find an increase in extracellular serotonin in the prefrontal cortex following acute or chronic atomoxetine treatment. Supporting atomoxetine's selectivity, human studies found no effects on platelet serotonin uptake (a marker of SERT inhibition) but robust inhibition of the pressor effects of tyramine (a marker of NET inhibition). Subsequently, atomoxetine was found to dose-dependently inhibit the NET from low doses in humans but did not inhibit the SERT to a clinically significant degree. Conversely, venlafaxine robustly inhibited the SERT but only inhibited the NET at high doses.

Atomoxetine has been found to act as an NMDA receptor antagonist in rat cortical neurons at therapeutic concentrations (IC_{50} = ~3,000 nM). It causes a use-dependent open-channel block and its binding site overlaps with the Mg^{2+} binding site. Atomoxetine's ability to increase prefrontal cortex firing rate in anesthetized rats could not be blocked by D_{1} or α_{1}-adrenergic receptor antagonists, but could be potentiated by NMDA or an α_{2}-adrenergic receptor antagonist, suggesting a glutaminergic mechanism. In Sprague Dawley rats, atomoxetine reduces NR2B protein content without altering transcript levels. Aberrant glutamate and NMDA receptor function have been implicated in the etiology of ADHD.

Atomoxetine also reversibly inhibits G protein-coupled inwardly rectifying potassium channel (GIRK) currents in Xenopus oocytes in a concentration-dependent, voltage-independent, and time-independent manner. K_{ir}3.1/3.2 ion channels are opened downstream of M_{2}, α_{2}, D_{2}, and A_{1} stimulation, as well as other G_{i}-coupled receptors. Therapeutic concentrations of atomoxetine are within range of interacting with GIRKs, especially in CYP2D6 poor metabolizers. It is not known whether this contributes to the therapeutic effects of atomoxetine in ADHD.

It has been found to inhibit voltage-gated sodium channels.

4-Hydroxyatomoxetine, the major active metabolite of atomoxetine in CYP2D6 extensive metabolizers, has been found to have sub-micromolar affinity for opioid receptors, acting as an antagonist at the μ-opioid receptor (MOR) and as a partial agonist at the κ-opioid receptor (KOR). The affinities (IC_{50}) of 4-hydroxyatomoxetine were 164 nM for the MOR, 88 nM for the KOR, 1,490 nM for the δ-opioid receptor (DOR), and >5,000 nM for the nociceptin receptor (ORL-1). Atomoxetine itself showed dramatically lower affinities (e.g., 25- to 50-fold). It is not known whether the actions of 4-hydroxyatomoxetine at the opioid receptors leads to CNS-related adverse effects with atomoxetine.

Atomoxetine does not alter locomotor activity in rodents, in contrast to stimulants like amphetamine. In addition, atomoxetine does not produce self-administration in monkeys, also in contrast to stimulants like amphetamine. The drug does not produce stimulant-like effects, euphoria, or reinforcing effects in humans, instead increasing negative and unpleasant ratings at the highest assessed doses.

Atomoxetine has been found to increase cortisol levels in humans.

=== Pharmacokinetics ===
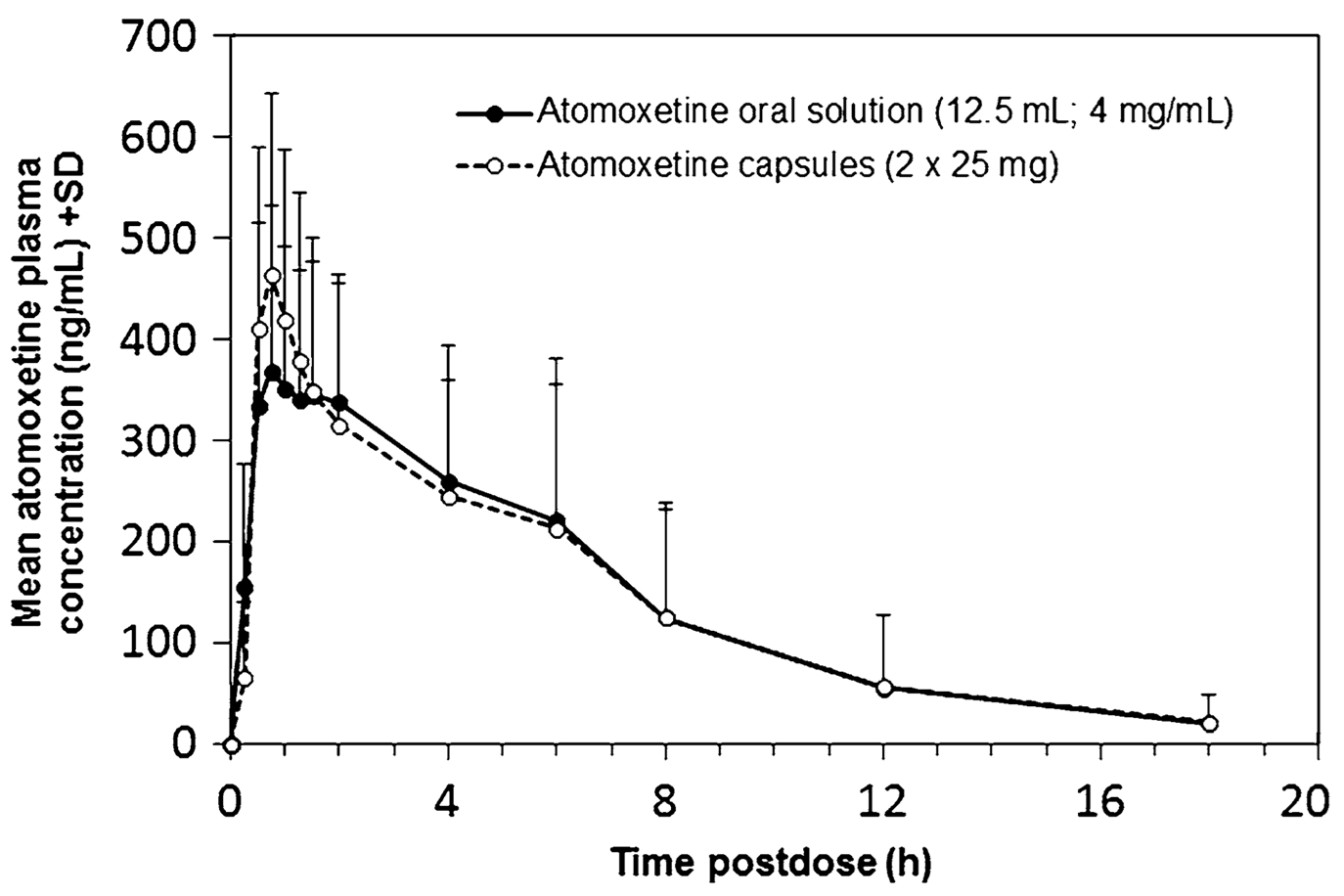
Mean circulating atomoxetine levels (ng/mL) with 50 mg atomoxetine as either oral solution or oral capsules in Japanese adults.

==== Absorption ====
The absorption of atomoxetine with oral administration is rapid and complete. The drug's absolute bioavailability is 63 to 94%. This is moderated by first-pass metabolism and CYP2D6 status, with poor metabolizers having a bioavailability of 94% and extensive metabolizers having a bioavailability of 63%. Extensive metabolizers are considered to have normal CYP2D6 activity and constitute >90% of people, while poor metabolizers constitute a small minority of up to 7%. The bioavailability of atomoxetine is not different between capsule and solution forms.

The time to peak levels of atomoxetine is 1 to 2 hours. It has been reported that the time to peak levels was 1.0 hours in CYP2D6 extensive metabolizers and 2.5 hours in CYP2D6 poor metabolizers. Taking atomoxetine with food does not affect its bioavailability or total exposure but decreases peak levels by 9% with a typical meal and 37% with a standard high-fat breakfast. In addition, food delays the time to peak levels by 3 hours. Atomoxetine exposure increases proportionally with higher doses over a range of 10 to 120 mg orally. Exposure to atomoxetine is proportional to body weight, and hence weight-normalizing dosing is required to produce equivalent exposure.

In CYP2D6 poor metabolizers, atomoxetine peak levels are 5- to 6-fold higher and total exposure is 8- to 10-fold higher than in CYP2D6 extensive metabolizers. Similarly, in Asian adults homozygous for the hypoactive CYP2D6*10 allele, atomoxetine peak levels were about 1.5-fold higher and total exposure 2-fold higher compared to extensive metabolizers. There is little accumulation of atomoxetine with repeated administration in CYP2D6 extensive metabolizers, but significant accumulation in CYP2D6 poor metabolizers. The pharmacokinetics of atomoxetine, for instance elimination half-life, volume of distribution, and clearance, are similar with a single dose versus at steady state.

==== Distribution ====
Atomoxetine is well-distributed and its volume of distribution is 0.85 to 1.02 L/kg in CYP2D6 extensive metabolizers and 2.25 L/kg in CYP2D6 poor metabolizers, with its distribution being equivalent to total body water. Atomoxetine and its metabolites show only limited partitioning into red blood cells. Atomoxetine crosses the blood–brain barrier, with this appearing to be due primarily to passive diffusion rather than active transport. The drug is not a substrate of P-glycoprotein. Animal studies have found that atomoxetine and/or its metabolites can cross the placenta, but fetal exposure was substantially lower than maternal exposure. Similarly, only a small amount of atomoxetine and/or metabolites were excreted in milk in animals.

Atomoxetine shows high plasma protein binding of 98.7% and is primarily bound to albumin and to a lesser extent to α_{1}-acid glycoprotein and immunoglobulin G (IgG). Atomoxetine's limitedly active metabolite N-desmethylatomoxetine is 99.1% bound to plasma proteins, whereas its active metabolite 4-hydroxyatomoxetine shows plasma protein binding of 66.6%, which is substantially less than that of atomoxetine itself.

==== Metabolism ====
Atomoxetine is primarily metabolized via oxidative metabolism. The three major metabolic pathways include aromatic ring hydroxylation mainly by CYP2D6 but also other cytochrome P450 enzymes into 4-hydroxyatomoxetine, benzylic hydroxylation by an unspecified enzyme into 2-hydroxymethylatomoxetine, and N-demethylation by CYP2C19 into N-desmethylatomoxetine. In addition, N-desmethylatomoxetine undergoes hydroxylation by CYP2D6 into N-desmethyl-4-hydroxyatomoxetine. The hydroxylated metabolites of atomoxetine undergo glucuronidation via UDP-glucuronyltransferase (UGT) enzymes to form glucuronide conjugates.

As previously described, first-pass metabolism of atomoxetine is substantially greater, bioavailability is lower, peak levels and total exposure are much greater, and elimination half-life is much longer in CYP2D6 poor metabolizers than in extensive metabolizers. The overall metabolism of atomoxetine is similar regardless of CYP2D6 status. In addition, 4-hydroxyatomoxetine remains the major metabolite of atomoxetine independently of CYP2D6 status. But the quantitative amounts of formed atomoxetine metabolites and their rates of formation are substantially different depending on CYP2D6 status. Studies with radiolabeled atomoxetine have shown that peak levels of radioactivity are essentially the same between CYP2D6 extensive metabolizers and CYP2D6 poor metabolizers. However, total exposure of radioactivity was larger and elimination half-life of radioactivity was longer (62 hours vs. 18 hours) in CYP2D6 poor metabolizers versus CYP2D6 extensive metabolizers. Circulating 4-hydroxyatomoxetine levels are about 1% of those of circulating atomoxetine levels in CYP2D6 extensive metabolizers and about 0.1% of those of circulating atomoxetine levels in CYP2D6 poor metabolizers. Similarly, N-desmethylatomoxetine circulates at much lower levels than atomoxetine, about 5% of those of atomoxetine in CYP2D6 extensive metabolizers and 45% of those of atomoxetine in CYP2D6 poor metabolizers.

4-Hydroxyatomoxetine shows similar affinity for the norepinephrine transporter (NET) as atomoxetine but much higher affinity for the serotonin transporter (SERT) in comparison (with SERT affinity ~14-fold lower than NET affinity), whereas N-desmethylatomoxetine shows much lower affinity for the monoamine transporters (MATs) than atomoxetine and 4-hydroxyatomoxetine (with NET affinity ~20-fold lower than that of atomoxetine). Despite differences in atomoxetine metabolism, CYP2D6 status has been said in literature reviews to not affect the overall tolerability and safety of atomoxetine. However, poor metabolizers did show greater heart rate increase (+9.4–11 bpm vs. +5.0–7.5 bpm), blood pressure increase (4.21 mm Hg vs. 2.13 mm Hg systolic and 2.75 mg Hg vs. 2.40 mm Hg diastolic), and more weight loss (–1.2 kg vs. +0.8 mg) than extensive metabolizers. In addition, various side effects, including insomnia, sedation, weight loss, constipation, dry mouth, erectile dysfunction, excessive sweating, and urinary retention, among others, have been found to be around twice as frequent in poor metabolizers relative to extensive metabolizers. The same was true for discontinuation rates (11.2% vs. 6.3%). In terms of dosage adjustment for CYP2D6 poor metabolizers or those taking strong CYP2D6 inhibitors, the Food and Drug Administration (FDA) label says that this may be necessary and provides directions for this, whereas literature reviews state that it is not considered necessary based on clinical trial experience.

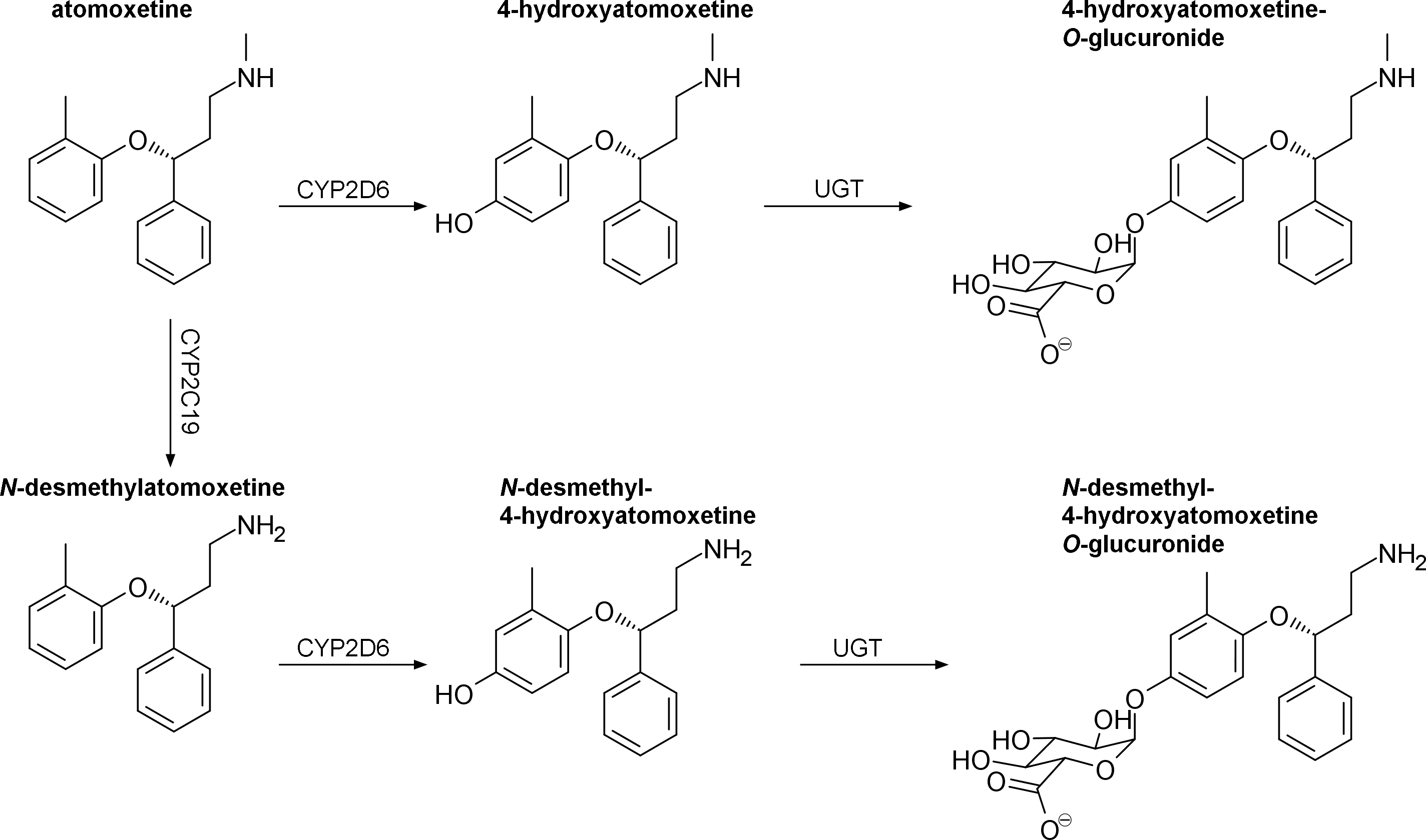
Major metabolites of atomoxetine in humans.

==== Elimination ====
Atomoxetine and its metabolites are eliminated mainly via excretion into urine. Less than 3% of atomoxetine is excreted unchanged in urine regardless of CYP2D6 status, indicating extensive metabolism. In CYP2D6 extensive metabolizers, who are considered to have normal CYP2D6 activity, more than 96% of a dose of radiolabeled atomoxetine is excreted in urine within 24 hours and 1 to 2% is excreted in feces. Conversely, in CYP2D6 poor metabolizers, excretion is slower, with only 27% excreted after 24 hours, a majority of radioactivity excreted within 72 hours, and ~144 hours required for full excretion. In addition, only 80% of radioactivity is excreted in urine while 13 to 22% is excreted in feces in CYP2D6 poor metabolizers. The major excreted metabolite of atomoxetine is 4-hydroxyatomoxetine glucuronide, which accounts for >80% of the dose in urine but <17% of the dose in feces. The fractions excreted in urine as 4-hydroxyatomoxetine and 4-hydroxyatomoxetine glucuronide account for 86% of a dose in CYP2D6 extensive metabolizers, but only 40% in CYP2D6 poor metabolizers. CYP2D6 poor metabolizers excrete greater amounts of minor atomoxetine metabolites, namely N-desmethylatomoxetine and 2-hydroxymethylatomoxetine and their conjugates, than extensive metabolizers.

The elimination half-life of atomoxetine is 4.5 to 5.3 hours in CYP2D6 extensive metabolizers. However, in CYP2D6 poor metabolizers, the half-life of atomoxetine is 19 to 21.6 hours, or about 4-fold longer in comparison. In CYP2D6 extensive metabolizers, the half-lives of 4-hydroxyatomoxetine and N-desmethylatomoxetine are similar at around 6 to 8 hours, whereas in CYP2D6 poor metabolizers, the half-life of N-desmethylatomoxetine is much longer at around 33 to 40 hours. Atomoxetine levels in cerebrospinal fluid (CSF) with atomoxetine at a dosage of 80 mg/day were 6.6 ng/mL at 8 hours post-dose and 1.4 ng/mL at 24 hours post-dose following 2 weeks of administration.

== Chemistry ==
Atomoxetine, or (−)-methyl[(3R)-3-(2-methylphenoxy)-3-phenylpropylamine, is a white, granular powder that is highly soluble in water.

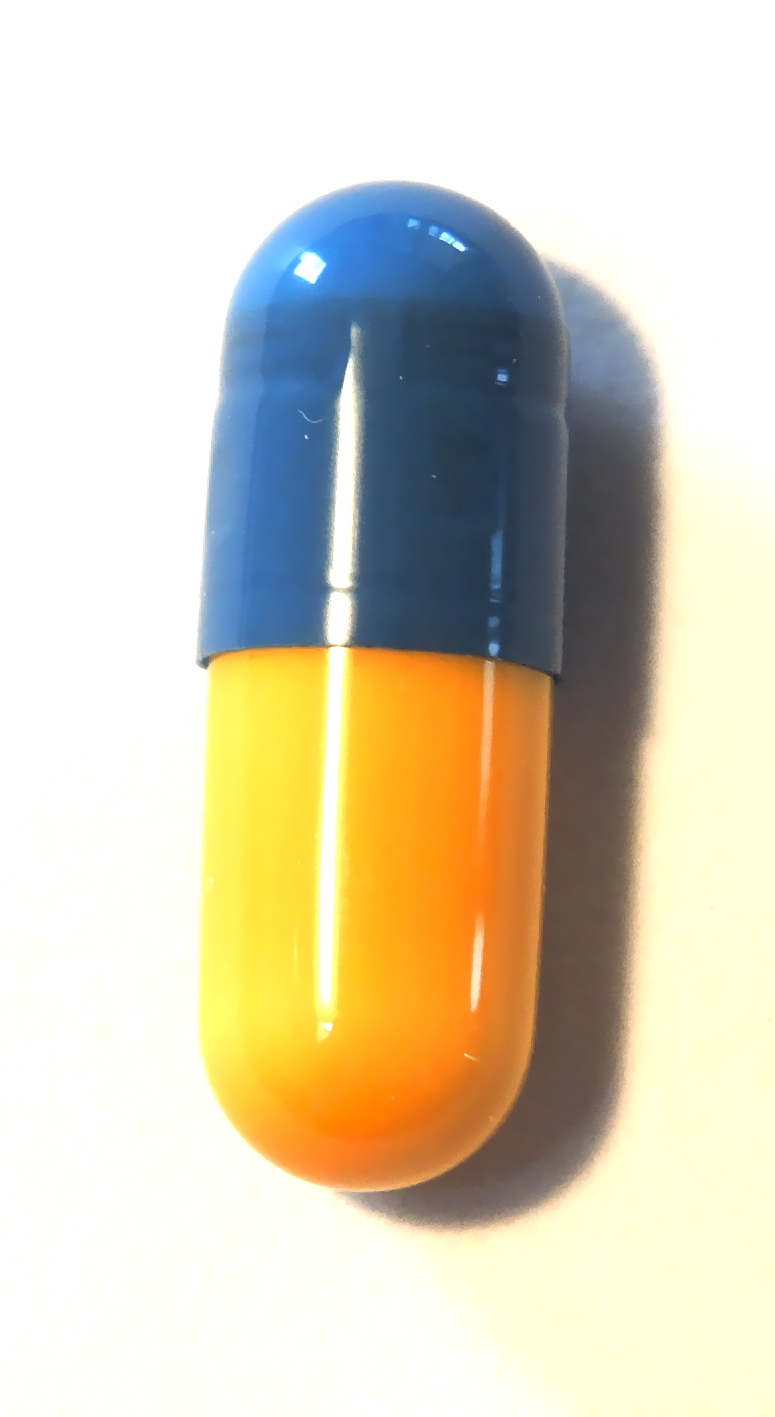
Strattera 60-mg capsule back

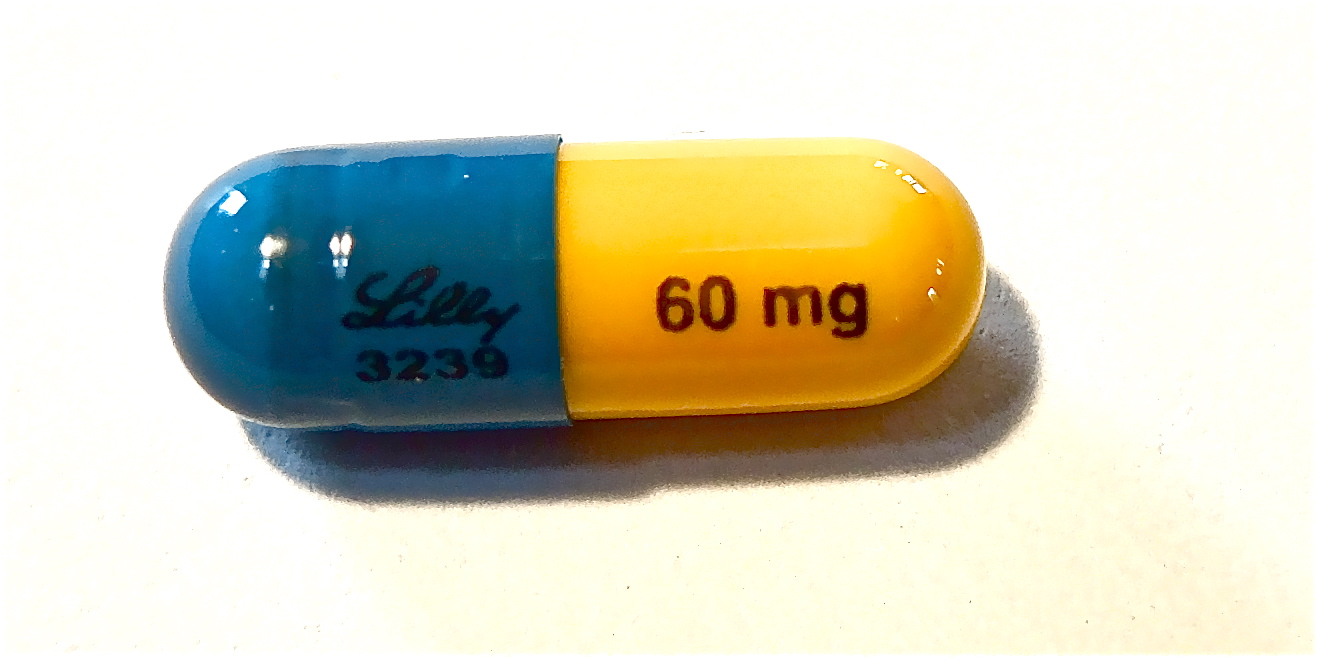
Strattera 60-mg capsule front with Lilly logo

=== Synthesis ===
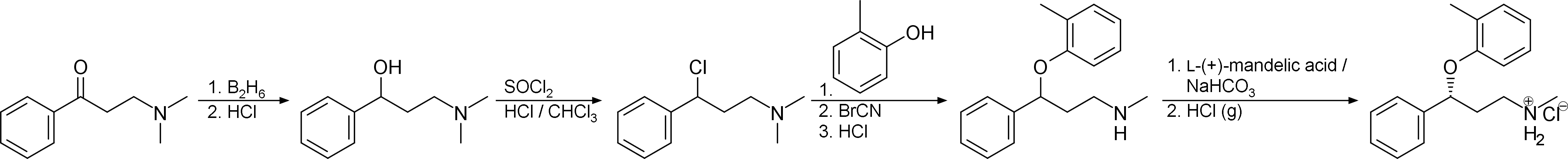
Original synthesis of atomoxetine salt, as patented by Eli Lilly and Company

=== Detection in biological fluids ===
Atomoxetine may be quantitated in plasma, serum, or whole blood to distinguish extensive versus poor metabolizers in those receiving the drug therapeutically, to confirm the diagnosis in potential poisoning victims, or to assist in the forensic investigation in a case of fatal overdosage.

== History ==
Atomoxetine is manufactured, marketed, and sold in the United States as the hydrochloride salt (atomoxetine HCl) under the brand name Strattera by Eli Lilly and Company, the original patent-filing company and current U.S. patent owner. Atomoxetine was initially intended to be developed as an antidepressant, but it was found to be insufficiently efficacious for treating depression. It was, however, found to be effective for ADHD and was approved by the FDA in 2002, for the treatment of ADHD. Its patent expired in May 2017. On 12 August 2010, Lilly lost a lawsuit that challenged its patent on Strattera, increasing the likelihood of an earlier entry of a generic into the US market. On 1 September 2010, Sun Pharmaceuticals announced it would begin manufacturing a generic in the United States. In a 29 July 2011 conference call, however, Sun Pharmaceutical's Chairman stated "Lilly won that litigation on appeal so I think [generic Strattera]'s deferred." In 2017 the FDA approved the generic production of atomoxetine by four pharmaceutical companies.

== Society and culture ==
=== Names ===
Atomoxetine was originally known as tomoxetine. It was renamed to avoid medication errors, as the name may be confused with tamoxifen.

In India, atomoxetine is sold under brand names including Axetra, Axepta, Attera, Tomoxetin, and Attentin. In Australia, Canada, Italy, Portugal, Romania, Spain, Switzerland, and the US, atomoxetine is sold under the brand name Strattera. In France, hospitals dispense atomoxetine under the brand name Strattera (it is not marketed in France). In the Czech Republic, it is sold under brand names including Mylan. In Poland, it is sold under the brand name Auroxetyn. In Indonesia, it is sold under the brand name Xenocy. In Iran, atomoxetine is sold under brand names including Stramox. In Brazil, it is sold under the brand name Atentah. In Turkey, it is sold under the brand names Attex, Setinox, and Atominex. In 2017, a generic version was approved in the United States.

=== Legal status ===
Atomoxetine has no risk of misuse and is not a controlled substance.

== Research ==
Besides treatment of ADHD, atomoxetine was under formal development by Eli Lilly and Company for the treatment of major depressive disorder, Alzheimer's disease, and Parkinson's disease. However, development for these indications was discontinued. The drug reached phase 3 clinical trials for treatment of Parkinson's disease prior to being discontinued. Though not approved for depression, atomoxetine has been studied and used off-label in the treatment of this condition, for instance as an adjunct to selective serotonin reuptake inhibitors (SSRIs) and to treat residual symptoms such as fatigue, but data are limited. It has also been studied and used to treat comorbid depression in people with ADHD.

Atomoxetine has been studied in the treatment of social anxiety disorder, with mixed findings. The drug has been found to reduce anxiety symptoms in children and adolescents with ADHD and comorbid anxiety disorders.

Atomoxetine may be used in those with ADHD and bipolar disorder although such use has not been well established. Some benefit has also been seen in people with ADHD and autism. As with other norepinephrine reuptake inhibitors it appears to reduce anxiety and depression symptoms, although research has focused mainly on specific patient groups such as those with concurrent ADHD or methamphetamine dependence.

Atomoxetine has been studied and used in the treatment of orthostatic hypotension. It has been reported to be more effective than midodrine. The drug synergistically increased blood pressure in combination with pyridostigmine. While acutely effective however, tachyphylaxis has been found to occur with continuous administration of atomoxetine. The reasons for this tolerance are unclear.

Though development for Alzheimer's disease was discontinued, perhaps due to negative trial findings, there has been continued interest in atomoxetine in the potential treatment of this disease as of 2025. It has also been studied to treat mild cognitive impairment or prodromal Alzheimer's disease.

Atomoxetine is being studied for treatment of sleep apnea in combination with various other drugs including oxybutynin or aroxybutynin, trazodone, antimineralocorticoids like spironolactone, an orexin receptor antagonist, pimavanserin, acetazolamide, dronabinol (Δ^{9}-tetrahydrocannabinol; THC), fesoterodine, and zolpidem.

Atomoxetine has been studied for reducing appetite and promoting weight loss in people with obesity, with mixed results.
