= Lortalamine =

Chemical compound

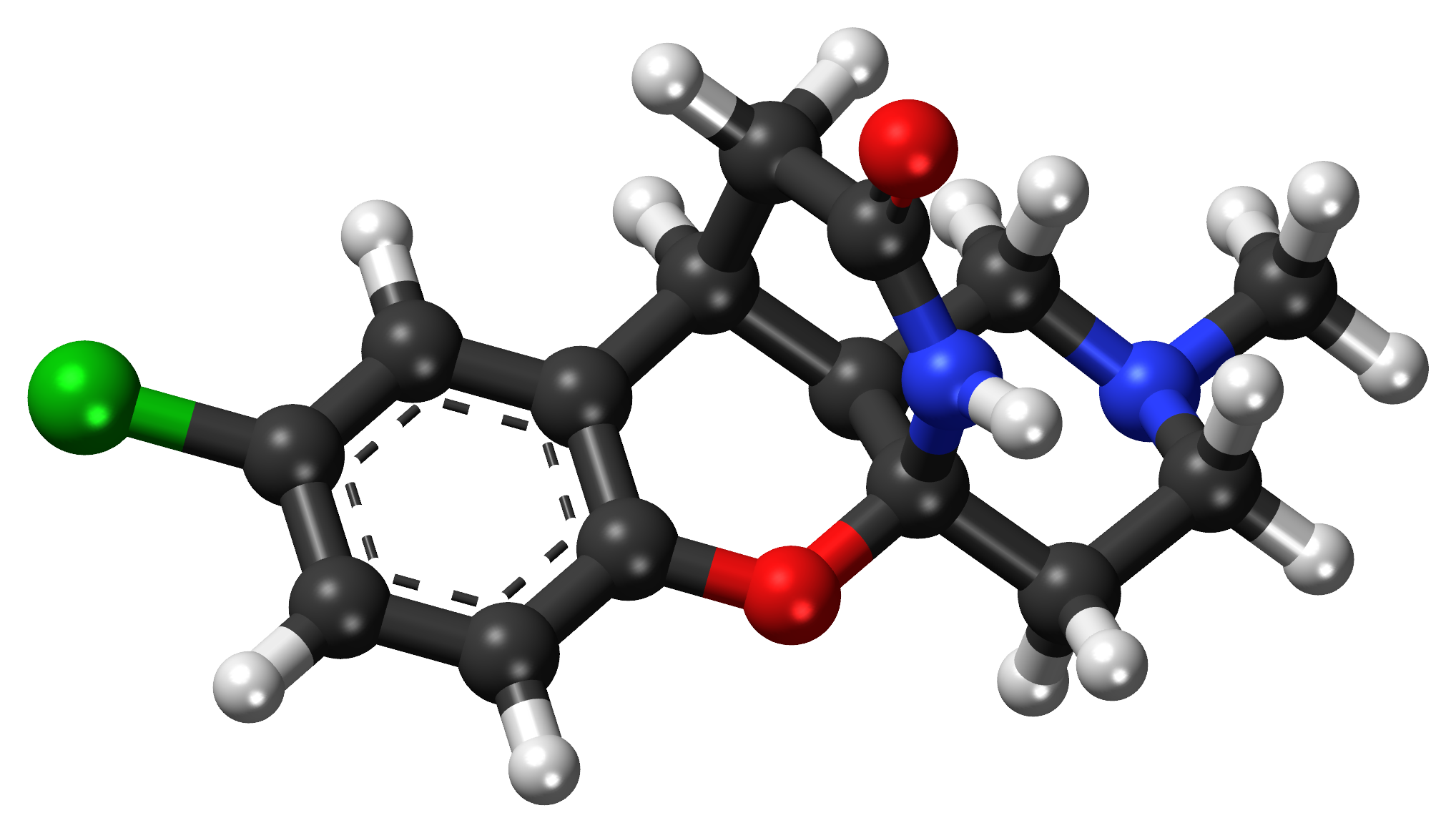

Clinical data
- Routes of administration: Oral
- ATC code: None

Pharmacokinetic data
- Elimination half-life: 5 hours
- Excretion: Renal (98%)

Identifiers
- IUPAC name: rel-(4aR,10R,10aS)-8-chloro-1,2,3,4,10,10a-hexahydro-2-methyl-4a,10-(iminoethano)-4aH-[1]benzopyrano[3,2-c]pyridin-12-one
- CAS Number: 70384-91-7
- PubChem CID: 51047
- ChemSpider: 16736803
- UNII: 9GIR4SV22T
- KEGG: D04781
- CompTox Dashboard (EPA): DTXSID00990578

Chemical and physical data
- Formula: C_{15}H_{17}ClN_{2}O_{2}
- Molar mass: 292.76 g·mol^{−1}
- 3D model (JSmol): Interactive image
- SMILES: Clc1ccc2O[C@]34NC(=O)C[C@@H](c2c1)[C@H]4CN(C)CC3

Lortalamine (LM-1404) is an antidepressant which was synthesized in the early 1980s. It acts as a potent and highly selective norepinephrine reuptake inhibitor. Lortalamine was under development for clinical use but was shelved, likely due to the finding that it produced ocular toxicity in animals. It has been used to label the norepinephrine transporter in positron emission tomography studies.

Dof:

== See also ==
- Norepinephrine reuptake inhibitor
