= Melitracen =

Chemical compound

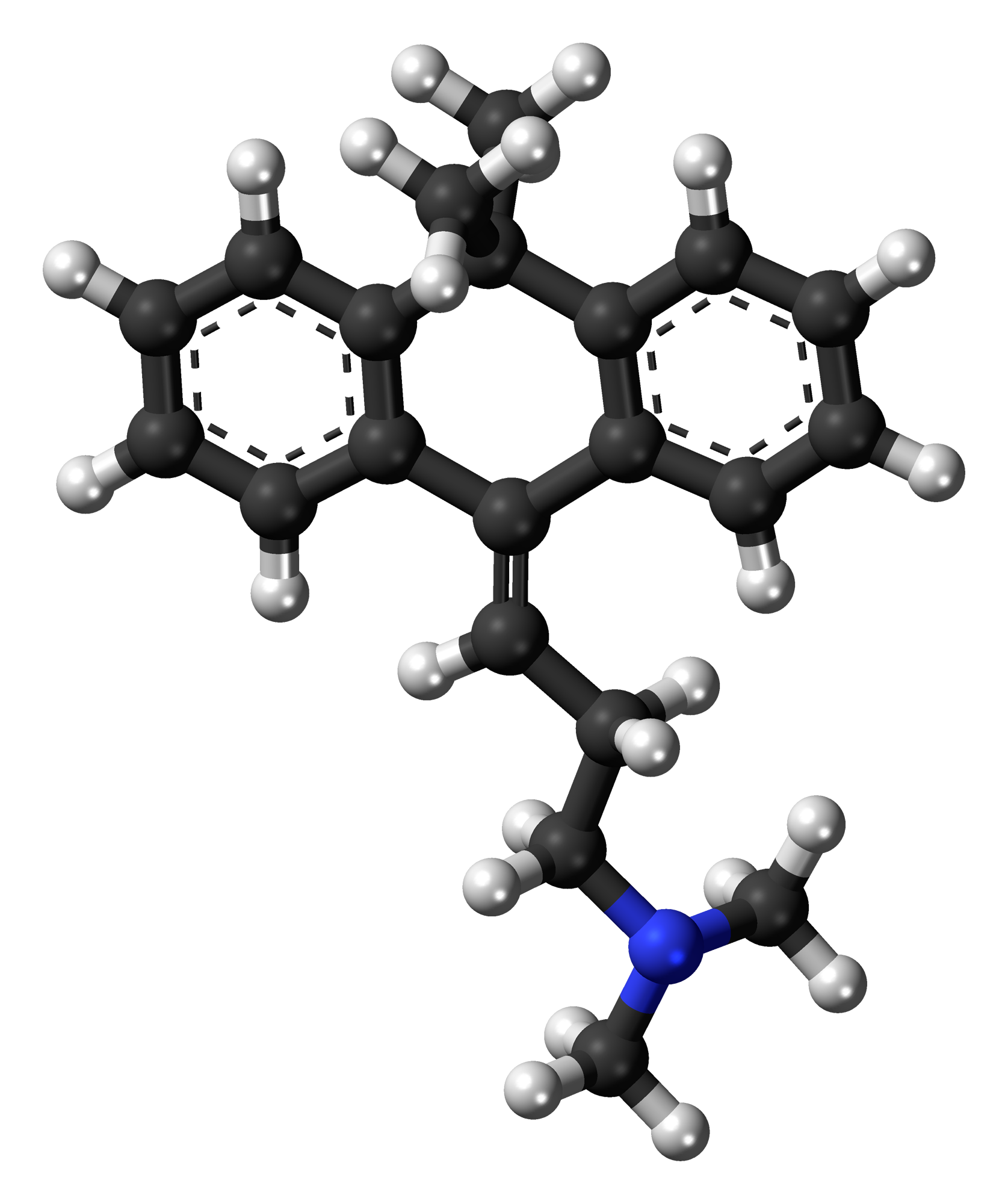

Clinical data
- Trade names: Adaptol, Dixeran, Melixeran, Thymeol, Trausabun
- AHFS/Drugs.com: International Drug Names
- Routes of administration: Oral, intramuscular injection
- ATC code: N06AA14 (WHO)

Legal status
- Legal status: In general: ℞ (Prescription only)

Identifiers
- IUPAC name: 3-(10,10-dimethylanthracen-9(10H)-ylidene)-N,N-dimethylpropan-1-amine
- CAS Number: 5118-29-6
- PubChem CID: 25382
- ChemSpider: 23697
- UNII: Q7T0Y1109Z
- KEGG: D08171
- ChEMBL: ChEMBL110094
- CompTox Dashboard (EPA): DTXSID4048274
- ECHA InfoCard: 100.023.507

Chemical and physical data
- Formula: C_{21}H_{25}N
- Molar mass: 291.438 g·mol^{−1}
- 3D model (JSmol): Interactive image
- SMILES: c3ccc2c(/C(c1c(cccc1)C2(C)C)=C/CCN(C)C)c3
- InChI: InChI=1S/C21H25N/c1-21(2)19-13-7-5-10-17(19)16(12-9-15-22(3)4)18-11-6-8-14-20(18)21/h5-8,10-14H,9,15H2,1-4H3; Key:GWWLWDURRGNSRS-UHFFFAOYSA-N

Melitracen (brand names Melixeran, Trausabun) is a tricyclic antidepressant (TCA), for the treatment of depression and anxiety. In addition to single drug preparations, it is also available as Deanxit, marketed by Lundbeck, a combination product containing both melitracen and flupentixol.

The pharmacology of melitracen has not been properly investigated and is largely unknown, but it is likely to act in a similar manner to other TCAs. Indeed, melitracen is reported to have imipramine and amitriptyline-like effects and efficacy against depression and anxiety, though with improved tolerability and a somewhat faster onset of action.

== See also ==
- Fluotracen
- Litracen
- Dimetacrine
