= Amedalin =

Group of stereoisomers

Clinical data
- ATC code: None

Identifiers
- IUPAC name: 3-Methyl-3-[3-(methylamino)propyl]-1-phenyl-1,3-dihydro-2H-indol-2-one
- CAS Number: 22136-26-1 22232-73-1 (HCl)
- PubChem CID: 31075
- ChemSpider: 28832
- UNII: 2OWK6X9N16
- KEGG: D02891
- ChEMBL: ChEMBL2110769
- CompTox Dashboard (EPA): DTXSID40865034

Chemical and physical data
- Formula: C_{19}H_{22}N_{2}O
- Molar mass: 294.398 g·mol^{−1}
- 3D model (JSmol): Interactive image
- SMILES: CC1(C2=CC=CC=C2N(C1=O)C3=CC=CC=C3)CCCNC
- InChI: InChI=1S/C19H22N2O/c1-19(13-8-14-20-2)16-11-6-7-12-17(16)21(18(19)22)15-9-4-3-5-10-15/h3-7,9-12,20H,8,13-14H2,1-2H3; Key:HBGWAZBZXJBYQD-UHFFFAOYSA-N

Amedalin (UK-3540-1) is an antidepressant which was synthesized in the early 1970s but was never marketed. It is a selective norepinephrine reuptake inhibitor, with no significant effects on the reuptake of serotonin and dopamine, and no antihistamine or anticholinergic properties.

== See also ==
- Daledalin
