= Esreboxetine =

Chemical compound

Clinical data
- Other names: AXS-14; PNU-165442G
- Routes of administration: Oral
- ATC code: None

Legal status
- Legal status: In general: uncontrolled

Identifiers
- IUPAC name: (2S)-2-[(S)-(2-ethoxyphenoxy)phenyl methyl]morpholine
- CAS Number: 98819-76-2
- PubChem CID: 65856
- IUPHAR/BPS: 4808
- ChemSpider: 59268
- UNII: L8S50ZY490
- KEGG: D09340
- CompTox Dashboard (EPA): DTXSID601009938

Chemical and physical data
- Formula: C_{19}H_{23}NO_{3}
- Molar mass: 313.397 g·mol^{−1}
- 3D model (JSmol): Interactive image
- SMILES: CCOC1=CC=CC=C1O[C@H]([C@@H]2CNCCO2)C3=CC=CC=C3
- InChI: InChI=1S/C19H23NO3/c1-2-21-16-10-6-7-11-17(16)23-19(15-8-4-3-5-9-15)18-14-20-12-13-22-18/h3-11,18-20H,2,12-14H2,1H3/t18-,19-/m0/s1; Key:CBQGYUDMJHNJBX-OALUTQOASA-N

Esreboxetine (developmental code names AXS-14, PNU-165442G) is a selective norepinephrine reuptake inhibitor. It is the (S,S)-(+)-enantiomer of reboxetine and is even more selective as a norepinephrine reuptake inhibitor in comparison.

Esreboxetine was developed by Pfizer for the treatment of neuropathic pain and fibromyalgia. It failed to show significant benefit over currently available medications and was discontinued. A subsequent 2012 study (n=277) found esreboxetine gave significant reductions in pain and fatigue in fibromyalgia patients.
