= Litracen =

Chemical compound

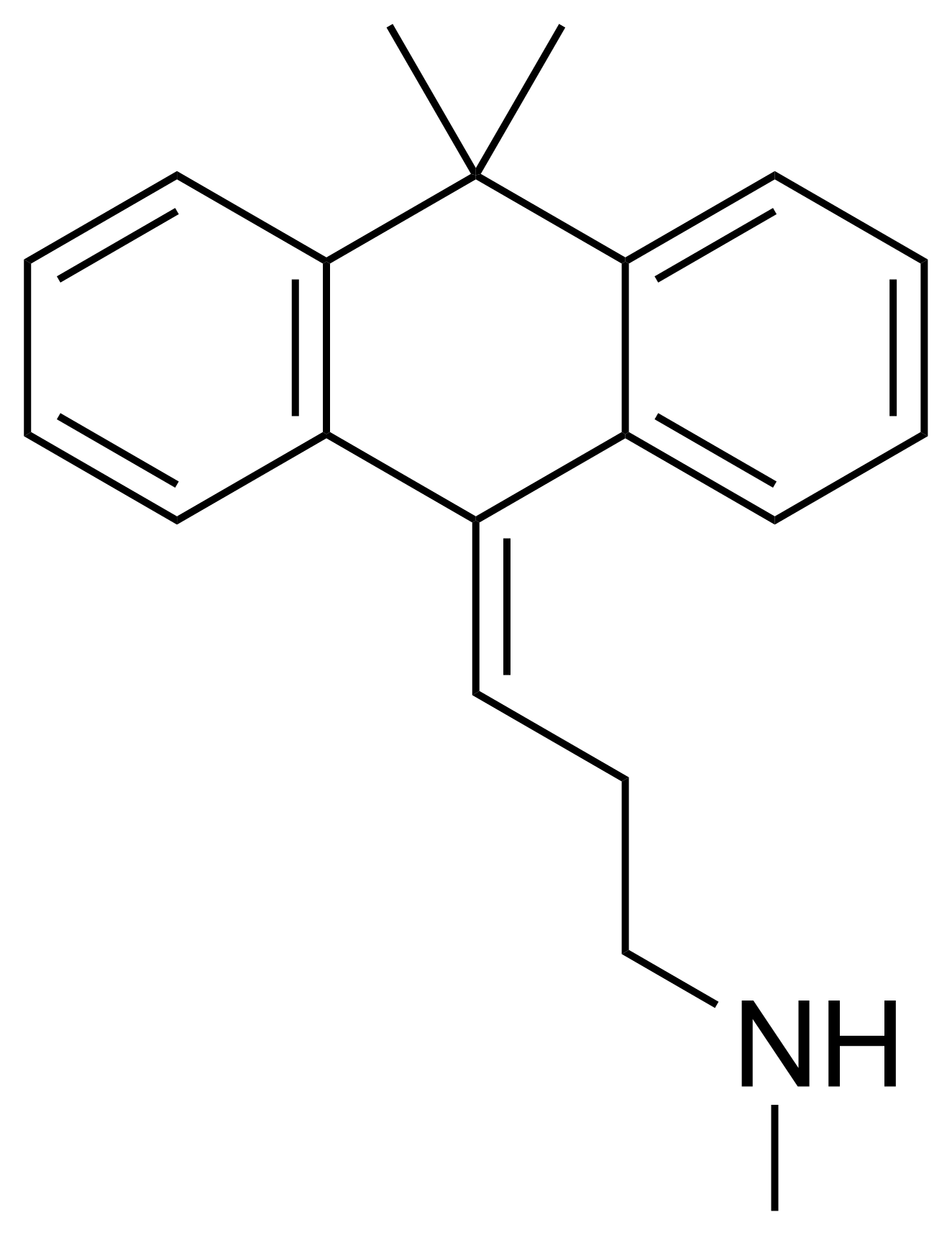

Clinical data
- Routes of administration: Oral
- ATC code: none

Legal status
- Legal status: In general: uncontrolled

Identifiers
- IUPAC name: 3-(10,10-dimethylanthracen-9(10H)-ylidene)-N-methylpropan-1-amine
- CAS Number: 5118-30-9 10563-71-0
- PubChem CID: 82730
- ChemSpider: 74659
- UNII: 2B3D399IVR
- CompTox Dashboard (EPA): DTXSID40199200

Chemical and physical data
- Formula: C_{20}H_{23}N
- Molar mass: 277.411 g·mol^{−1}
- 3D model (JSmol): Interactive image
- SMILES: c3ccc2c(/C(c1c(cccc1)C2(C)C)=C\CCNC)c3

Litracen (N-7,049) is a tricyclic antidepressant which was never marketed.

== See also ==
- Fluotracen
- Melitracen
