= Alpha-adrenergic agonist =

Class of drugs

Alpha adrenergic agonist
- Drug class
- Skeletal structor formula of phenylephrine, a common nasal decongestant

Class identifiers
- Use: Decongestant, Hypotension, Bradycardia, Hypothermia etc.
- ATC code: N07
- Biological target: Alpha adrenergic receptors of the α subtype

External links
- MeSH: D000316

Legal status

Alpha-adrenergic agonists are a class of sympathetic agents that selectively stimulate alpha adrenergic receptors. The alpha-adrenergic receptor has two subclasses, α_{1} and α_{2}. Alpha 2 receptors are associated with sympatholytic properties, while alpha 1 receptors are associated with sympathomimetic properties.

Alpha-adrenergic agonists have the opposite function of alpha blockers. Alpha adrenoreceptor ligands mimic the action of epinephrine and norepinephrine signaling in the heart, smooth muscle and central nervous system, with norepinephrine being the highest affinity for adrenergic receptors.

The activation of α_{1} stimulates the membrane bound enzyme phospholipase C, and activation of α_{2} inhibits the enzyme adenylate cyclase. Inactivation of adenylate cyclase in turn leads to the inactivation of the secondary messenger cyclic adenosine monophosphate and induces smooth muscle and blood vessel constriction.

== Classes ==
Norepinephrine (noradrenaline)

Although complete selectivity between receptor agonism is rarely achieved, some agents have partial selectivity. NB: the inclusion of a drug in each category just indicates the activity of the drug at that receptor, not necessarily the selectivity of the drug (unless otherwise noted).

=== α_{1} agonist ===
α_{1} agonist: stimulates phospholipase C activity. (vasoconstriction and mydriasis; used as vasopressors, nasal decongestants and during eye exams). Selected examples are:

- Adrenoswitch-1 (photoswitchable partial α_{1} agonist and light-controlled mydriatic)
- Methoxamine
- Midodrine
- Metaraminol
- Phenylephrine
- Amidephrine
- Sdz-nvi-085 [104195-17-7].

=== α_{2} agonist ===
α_{2} agonist: inhibits adenylyl cyclase activity, reduces brainstem vasomotor center-mediated CNS activation; used as antihypertensive, sedative & treatment of opiate dependence and alcohol withdrawal symptoms). Selected examples are:

- Agmatine
- Brimonidine
- Clonidine (mixed alpha2-adrenergic and imidazoline-I1 receptor agonist)
- Dexmedetomidine
- Fadolmidine
- Guanfacine, (preference for alpha2A-subtype of adrenoceptor)
- Guanabenz (most selective agonist for alpha2-adrenergic as opposed to imidazoline-I1)
- Guanoxabenz (metabolite of guanabenz)
- Xylazine (not approved for human use)
- Tizanidine
- Methyldopa
- Methylnorepinephrine
- Norepinephrine
- (R)-3-nitrobiphenyline, an α_{2C} selective agonist as well as a weak antagonist at the α_{2A} and α_{2B} subtypes.
- Amitraz
- Detomidine
- Lofexidine, an α_{2A} adrenergic receptor agonist.
- Medetomidine, an α2 adrenergic agonist.
- Tasipimidine

=== Nonspecific agonist ===
Nonspecific agonists act as agonists at both alpha-1 and alpha-2 receptors.

- Xylometazoline
- Oxymetazoline
- Apraclonidine
- Cirazoline
- Epinephrine

=== Undetermined/unsorted ===
The following agents are also listed as agonists by MeSH.

- Ergotamine
- Etilefrine
- Indanidine
- Mephentermine
- Metaraminol
- Methoxamine
- Mivazerol
- Naphazoline
- Norfenefrine
- Octopamine
- Phenylpropanolamine
- Propylhexedrine
- Rilmenidine
- Romifidine
- Synephrine
- Talipexole

== Clinical significance ==
Alpha-adrenergic agonists, more specifically the auto receptors of alpha 2 neurons, are used in the treatment of glaucoma by decreasing the production of aqueous fluid by the ciliary bodies of the eye and also by increasing uveoscleral outflow. Medications such as clonidine and dexmedetomidine target pre-synaptic auto receptors, therefore leading to an overall decrease in norepinephrine which clinically can cause effects such as sedation, analgesia, lowering of blood pressure and bradycardia. There is also low quality evidence that they can reduce shivering post operatively.

The reduction of the stress response caused by alpha 2 agonists were theorised to be beneficial peri operatively by reducing cardiac complications, however this has shown not to be clinically effective as there was no reduction in cardiac events or mortality but there was an increased incidence of hypotension and bradycardia.

Alpha-2 adrenergic agonists are sometimes prescribed alone or in combination with stimulants to treat ADHD.

== See also ==
- Alpha blocker
- Adrenergic agonist
- Beta-adrenergic agonist
