= Vatinoxan =

Clinical data
- Other names: MK 467; mk-467 free base; vatinoxanum
- Drug class: Alpha blocker
- ATC code: None

Identifiers
- IUPAC name: N-[2-[(2R,12bS)-2'-oxospiro[1,3,4,6,7,12b-hexahydro-[1]benzofuro[2,3-a]quinolizine-2,5'-imidazolidine]-1'-yl]ethyl]methanesulfonamide
- CAS Number: 114914-42-0
- PubChem CID: 163952
- ChemSpider: 143789
- UNII: 342EYN0QFD
- KEGG: D11320; D11321
- ChEMBL: ChEMBL4298165
- CompTox Dashboard (EPA): DTXSID80921542

Chemical and physical data
- Formula: C_{20}H_{26}N_{4}O_{4}S
- Molar mass: 418.51 g·mol^{−1}
- 3D model (JSmol): Interactive image
- SMILES: [H][C@@]12C[C@@]3(CNC(=O)N3CCNS(C)(=O)=O)CCN1CCC1=C2OC2=CC=CC=C12
- InChI: InChI=1S/C20H26N4O4S/c1-29(26,27)22-8-11-24-19(25)21-13-20(24)7-10-23-9-6-15-14-4-2-3-5-17(14)28-18(15)16(23)12-20/h2-5,16,22H,6-13H2,1H3,(H,21,25)/t16-,20+/m0/s1; Key:GTBKISRCRQUFNL-OXJNMPFZSA-N

Vatinoxan, originally known as MK-467, is an α_{2}-adrenergic receptor antagonist used in veterinary medicine alongside α_{2}-adrenergic receptor agonists to counteract vasoconstriction and hypertension while maintaining sedation. Vatinoxan does not cross the blood–brain barrier giving it a unique pharmacological profile compared to the other α_{2}-adrenergic receptor antagonists and distinct clinical application.

== Medical uses ==
Vatinoxan mitigates the cardiovascular depression caused by medetomidine and dexmedetomidine, although hypotension may still occur. Administration of dobutamine, norepinephrine, or phenylephrine has been shown to restore normotension.

Vatinoxan does not reduce central nervous system depression, as it is unable to cross the blood–brain barrier. However, it may influence the sedative effects of α_{2}-adrenergic receptor agonists.

== Combination with medetomidine ==
A fixed-dose combination of medetomidine with vatinoxan (medetomidine/vatinoxan) is used to provide sedation whilst negating some of the negative cardiovascular effects of medetomidine. This combination medication was approved in the US in 2022, and is sold under the brand name Zenalpha.

Co-administration of vatinoxan and medetomidine improves recovery following atipamezole administration in sheep and dogs.

== Pharmacology ==
Vatinoxan binds to the α_{2}-adrenergic receptor at a ratio of 105:1 over the α_{1}-adrenergic receptor. Vatinoxan appears to have no clinically relevant effect on the α_{1}-adrenergic receptor based on a study in the horse and sheep. Vatinoxan's low lipid solubility, molecular weight, ionisation, and protein binding cause it to poorly antagonise the α_{2}-adrenergic receptors in the central nervous system whilst selectively antagonising peripheral and cardiovascular receptors. These properties make vatinoxan unique to the other α_{2}-adrenergic receptor antagonists.

== Research ==
In a study on horses, vatinoxan administration was found to reduce medetomidine-induced sedation, which the authors hypothesised was due to altered clearance of medetomidine. Conversely, a study in sheep reported that co-administration of vatinoxan and medetomidine enhanced sedation.

Vatinoxan may also counteract the severe respiratory effects caused by α_{2}-adrenergic receptor agonists in sheep.

Additionally, vatinoxan has been shown to reduce the minimum alveolar concentration (MAC) of isoflurane and sevoflurane in two studies, although the underlying mechanism remains unclear and warrants further investigation.
