= Xylazine =

Veterinary anesthetic, sedative and analgesic

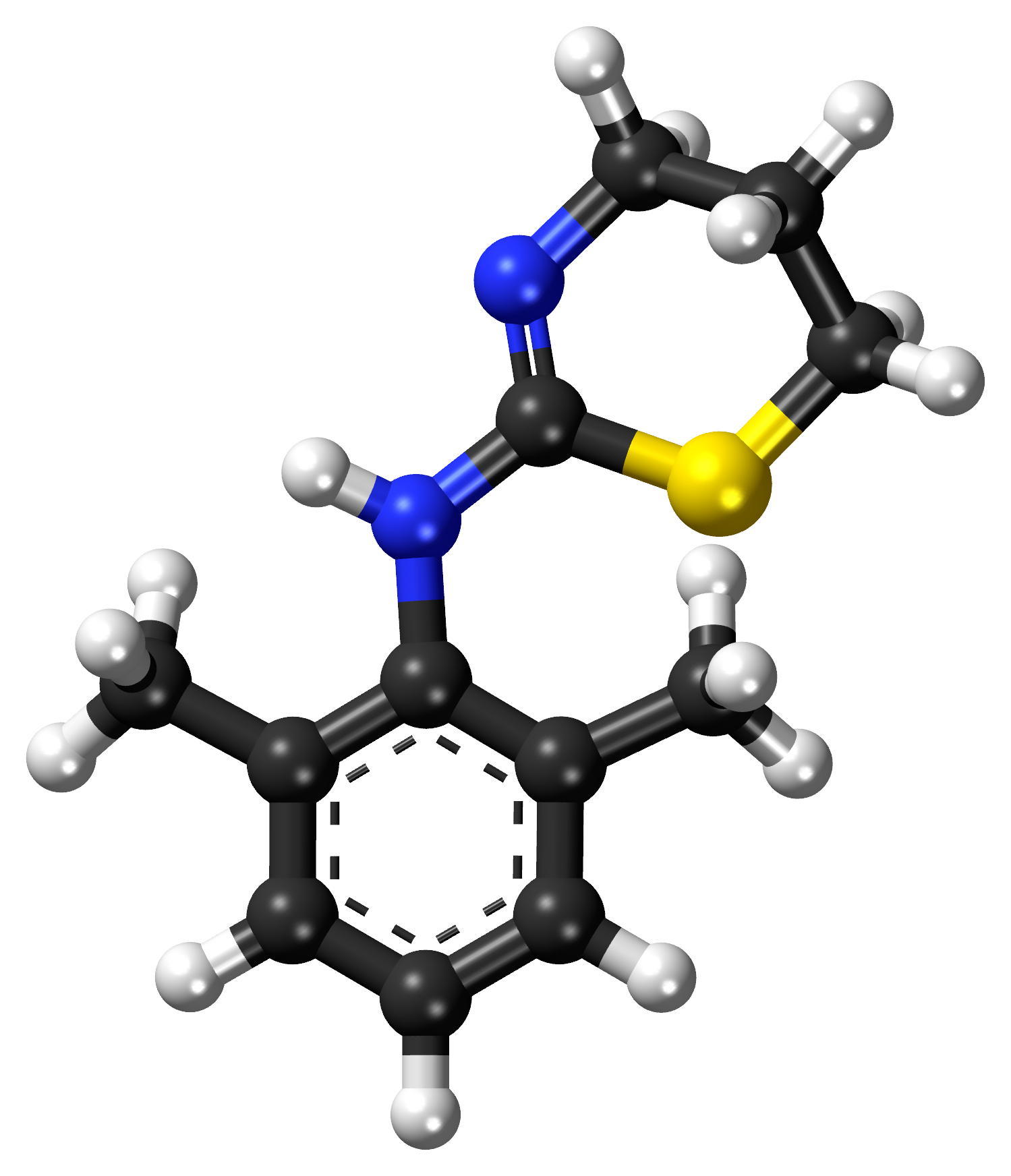

Clinical data
- Pronunciation: /ˈzaɪləziːn/ ZY-lə-zeen
- Trade names: Rompun, Anased, Sedazine, Chanazine, others
- AHFS/Drugs.com: International Drug Names
- License data: US DailyMed: Xylazine
- Routes of administration: By mouth, inhalation, subcutaneous, intramuscular, intravenous
- Drug class: α_{2}-Adrenergic receptor agonist; Sedative; Anesthetic; Emetic
- ATCvet code: QN05CM92 (WHO)

Legal status
- Legal status: AU: S4 (Prescription only); UK: Class C; US: ℞-only; Veterinary Use

Identifiers
- IUPAC name: N-(2,6-Dimethylphenyl)-5,6-dihydro-4H-1,3-thiazin-2-amine
- CAS Number: 7361–61–7
- PubChem CID: 5707
- IUPHAR/BPS: 523
- ChemSpider: 5505
- UNII: 2KFG9TP5V8
- KEGG: D08683
- ChEMBL: ChEMBL297362
- CompTox Dashboard (EPA): DTXSID3040643
- ECHA InfoCard: 100.028.093

Chemical and physical data
- Formula: C_{12}H_{16}N_{2}S
- Molar mass: 220.33 g·mol^{−1}
- 3D model (JSmol): Interactive image
- SMILES: N\1=C(\SCCC/1)Nc2c(cccc2C)C
- InChI: InChI=1S/C12H16N2S/c1-9-5-3-6-10(2)11(9)14-12-13-7-4-8-15-12/h3,5-6H,4,7-8H2,1-2H3,(H,13,14); Key:BPICBUSOMSTKRF-UHFFFAOYSA-N

Xylazine is a structural analog of clonidine and an α_{2}-adrenergic receptor agonist, sold under many trade names worldwide, most notably the Bayer brand name Rompun, as well as Anased, Sedazine and Chanazine.

Xylazine is a common veterinary drug used for sedation, anesthesia, muscle relaxation, and analgesia in animals such as horses, cattle, and other mammals. In veterinary anesthesia, it is often used in combination with ketamine. Veterinarians also use xylazine as an emetic, especially in cats. Drug interactions vary with different animals.

Xylazine was first investigated for human use in the 1960s in West Germany for antihypertensive effects before being discontinued and marketed as a veterinary sedative. Xylazine's mechanism of action was discovered in 1981, which led to the creation of other α_{2}-adrenergic receptor agonists such as medetomidine and dexmedetomidine.

Xylazine has become a commonly abused street drug in the United States where it is known by the street name "tranq", particularly in the territory of Puerto Rico. The drug is used as a cutting agent for heroin and fentanyl.

== History ==
Xylazine was discovered as an antihypertensive agent in 1962 by Farbenfabriken Bayer in Leverkusen, West Germany. In human trials xylazine was found to depress the central nervous system leading to the discontinuation of further research for its use in humans and it was instead marketed as a veterinary sedative, starting in the late 1960s. Xylazine proved popular and in the 1970s became one of the most common large animal sedatives. Xylazine's muscle relaxant effect inhibits the transmission of neural impulses in the central nervous system. In 1981 a study discovered that the cause sedation was due to xylazine's effect on the α2-adrenergic receptor. This led to the development of other α_{2}-adrenergic receptor agonists such as detomidine, medetomidine, dexmedetomidine, and romifidine.

In the United States, xylazine was approved by the FDA only for veterinary use as a sedative, analgesic, and muscle relaxant in dogs, cats, horses, elk, fallow deer, mule deer, sika deer, and white-tailed deer.

In scientific research using animal experiments, xylazine is a component of the most common anesthetic, ketamine-xylazine, to anesthetize rats, mice, hamsters, and guinea pigs.

Xylazine has not previously been a controlled substance; however, due to illicit abuse, legislative restrictions have been proposed in multiple countries. Xylazine was made a class C drug in the UK on 15 January 2025.

== Veterinary use ==
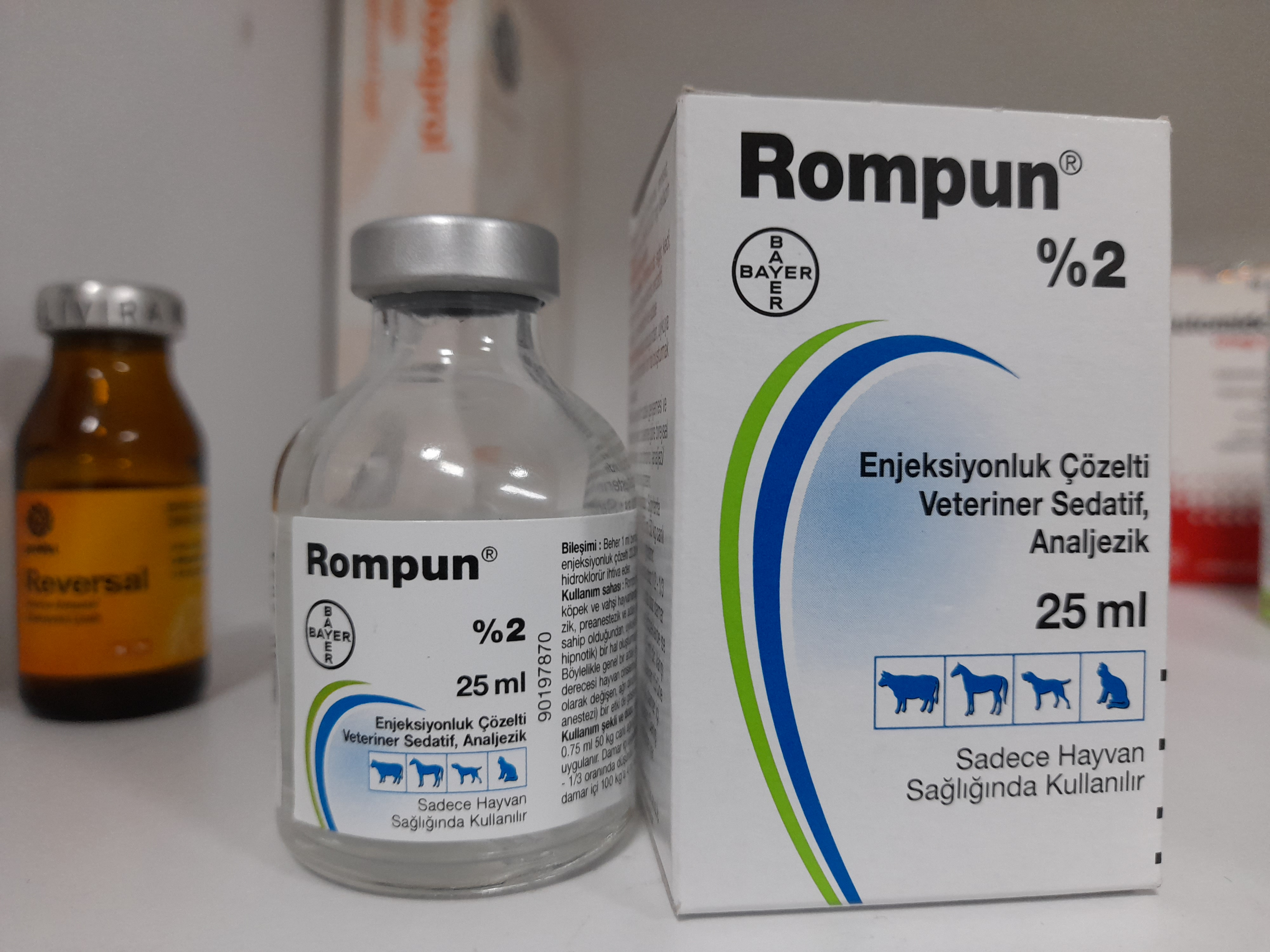
As a veterinary anesthetic, xylazine is administered once for intended effect before surgical procedures (trade name: Rompun)

Xylazine is widely used in veterinary medicine as a sedative, muscle relaxant, and analgesic. It is frequently used in the treatment of tetanus. It is not used in human medical treatment. Xylazine is similar to drugs such as phenothiazines, tricyclic antidepressants, and clonidine. As an anesthetic, it is typically used in conjunction with ketamine. In animals, xylazine may be administered intramuscularly, intravenously, and intraosseously. Subcutaneous, oral transmusocal and intranasal have been investigated but are not standard routes for xylazine administration. As a veterinary anesthetic, xylazine is typically only administered once for the intended effect before or during surgical procedures. α_{2}-Adrenergic receptor antagonists such as atipamezole and yohimbine may be used to reverse the effects of xylazine in animals. Xylazine is licensed for use in non-meat horses. Off-label use in cattle is common with recommended withholding periods of 1–5 days for dairy cattle and 4–10 days for meat cattle. Cattle are more sensitive to xylazine than horses with the sensitivity being greater in meat cattle breeds than dairy cattle breeds.

Xylazine's use in cats and dogs is being replaced with the more selective alpha_{2} adrenergic receptor agonists medetomidine and dexmedetomidine and in some countries xylazine is rarely used with cats and dogs.

High amounts of catecholamines in a patient will require higher doses of xylazine to be administered to provide sedation. The heightened levels required may not be practical or possible to administer and regular doses may cause excitement.

=== Side effects ===
Side effects in animals include transient hypertension and hypotension. Xylazine decreases both respiration rate and minute ventilation, although the changes to PaCO_{2} and PaO_{2} are minor and innocuous.

Xylazine has been demonstrated to reduce the dose of epinephrine that causes arrythmia in dogs anaesthetised with isoflurane and halothane.

Xylazine administration in sheep activates pulmonary macrophages that damage the capillary endothelium and alveolar type I cells. This in turns causes alveolar haemorrhage and oedema causing hypoxaemia.

Intracarotid administration can cause seizures and excitement in horses.

Xylazine has been shown to cause myometrial contractions in pregnant cattle. Further evidence of xylazine's effect on pregnant animals is lacking and although other a_{2} adrenergic receptor agonists have been shown to not cause the same myometrial contraction the administration of a_{2} adrenergic receptor agonists is not recommended and for animals near-term should only be used in specific circumstances.

Xylazine affects the glucose level via the activation of alpha_{2A} andrenergic receptors on beta cells, which prevents insulin release. alpha_{2} adrenergic receptors have been reported to cause transient hyperglycaemia with xylazine being reported as a cause in cattle and equine. The renal threshold for glucose is not exceeded due to the hyperglycaemia with clinical doses. An alpha_{2} adrenergic receptor antagonist can reverse the effect.

Emesis is the most common side effect in small animals; however, this can be a desired effect and xylazine is often used as an emetic in cats.

== Pharmacology ==
=== Pharmacodynamics ===
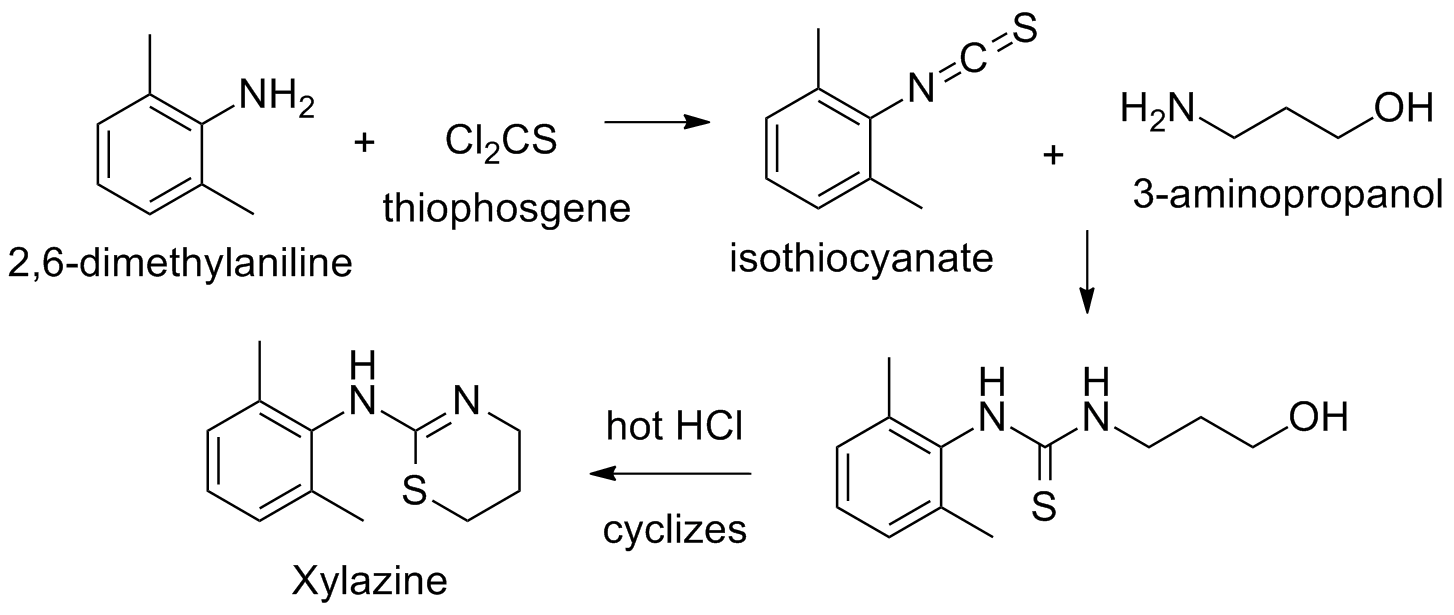
Xylazine synthesis adapted from Elliot & Ruehle (1986).

Xylazine is a potent α_{2}-adrenergic receptor agonist. When xylazine and other α_{2}-adrenergic receptor agonists are administered, they distribute throughout the body within 30 to 40 minutes. Due to xylazine's highly lipophilic nature, it directly stimulates central α_{2}-adrenergic receptors as well as peripheral α-adrenergic receptors in a variety of tissues. As an agonist, xylazine reduces release of norepinephrine in the central nervous system. It does so by mimicking norepinephrine in binding to the pre-synaptic surface autoreceptors, which leads to feedback inhibition of norepinephrine release. Recent data suggests that xylazine treatment can induce dopamine release in the nucleus accumbens through an unresolved mechanism, and this effect is blocked by atipamezole.

Xylazine also serves as a transport inhibitor by suppressing norepinephrine transport function through competitive inhibition of substrate transport. Accordingly, xylazine significantly increases K_{m} and does not affect V_{max}. This likely occurs by direct interaction on an area that overlaps with the antidepressant binding site. For example, xylazine and clonidine suppress uptake of iobenguane (MIBG), a norepinephrine analogue, in neuroblastoma cells. Xylazine's chemical structure closely resembles clonidine.

It has also been reported that xylazine activates the κ-opioid receptors, with low potency, which may contribute to its effects.

Unlike other α_{2}-adrenergic receptor agonists xylazine does not have any imidazoline receptor activity. Xylazine binds at a ratio of 160:0, the lowest of all α_{2}-adrenergic receptor agonists and 1/10th of that of medetomidine and dexmedotimidine.

Xylazine is less selective than the other α_{2}-Adrenergic receptor agonists.

The analgesic effect of xylazine comes from binding to receptors at the substantia gelatinosa and locus coeruleus.

=== Pharmacokinetics ===
==== In animals ====
In dogs, sheep, horses, and cattle, the half-life is very short: only 1– 6 minutes. Complete elimination of the drug can take up to 23 minutes in sheep and up to 49 minutes in horses. In young rats the half-life is one hour. Xylazine has a large volume of distribution of V_{d} = 1.9 –2.5 for horses, cattle, sheep, and dogs. Though the peak plasma concentrations are reached in 12 –14 minutes in all species, the bioavailability varies between species. The half-life depends on the age of the animal, as age is related to prolonged duration of anesthesia and recovery time. Toxicity occurs with repeated administration, given that the metabolic clearance of the drug is usually calculated as 7– 9 times the half-life, which is 4 to 5 days for the clearance of xylazine.

==== In humans ====
Xylazine is absorbed, metabolized, and eliminated rapidly. It can be inhaled or administered intravenously, intramuscularly, subcutaneously, or orally either by itself or in conjunction with other anesthetics, such as ketamine, barbiturates, chloral hydrate, and halothane in order to provide reliable anesthesia effects. The most common route of administration is injection.

Xylazine's action can be seen usually 15–30 minutes after administration and the sedative effect may continue for 1–2 hours and last up to 4 hours. Once xylazine gains access to the vascular system, it is distributed within the blood, allowing it to enter the heart, lungs, liver, and kidneys. In non-fatal cases, the blood plasma concentrations range from 0.03 to 4.6 mg/L. Xylazine diffuses extensively and penetrates the blood–brain barrier, since the molecule does not have a charge and dissolves in lipids.

Xylazine is metabolized by the liver's cytochrome P450 enzymes. When it reaches the liver, xylazine is metabolized and proceeds to the kidneys to be excreted in urine. Around 70% of a dose is excreted unchanged. Thus, urine can be used in detecting xylazine administration because it contains many metabolites, which are the main targets and products in urine. Within a few hours, xylazine decreases to undetectable levels. Other factors can also significantly impact the pharmacokinetics of xylazine, such as sex, nutrition, environmental conditions, and prior diseases.

Xylazine metabolites
Xylazine-M (2,6-dimethylaniline)	Xylazine-M (N-thiourea-2,6-dimethylaniline)	Xylazine-M (sulfone-HO-) isomer 2
Xylazine-M (HO-2,6-dimethylaniline isomer 1)	Xylazine-M (HO-2,6-dimethylaniline isomer 2)	Xylazine M (oxo-)
Xylazine-M (HO-) isomer 1	Xylazine-M (HO-) isomer 1 glucuronide	Xylazine-M (HO-) isomer 2
Xylazine-M (HO-) isomer 2 glucuronide	Xylazine-M (HO-oxo-) isomer	Xylazine-M (HO-oxo-) isomer 1 glucuronide
Xylazine-M (HO-oxo-) isomer 2	Xylazine-M (HO-oxo-) isomer 2 glucuronide	Xylazine-M (sulfone)
	Xylazine-M (sulfone-HO-) isomer 1	

== Recreational use ==
In 1979, the first case of xylazine toxicity was reported in a 34-year-old male who had self-medicated for insomnia with an injection of 1g of xylazine.

In the US, xylazine is not regulated as a controlled substance under the Controlled Substances Act. It is sold online through distributors often without requiring proof of a veterinary license. The cost to purchase xyzaline from overseas suppliers is around $6–20 per kilogram. This low price makes it attractive for dealers looking for a cheap additive that is addictive and not treatable with opiate withdrawal medications. The withdrawal can last for two weeks and has a quicker onset than fentanyl.

As an adulterant, xylazine is most commonly ingested with fentanyl. Xylazine has also been reported in combination with medetomidine, another potent α_{2}-adrenergic receptor agonist. It is unknown if drug users are ingesting it knowingly. As of 2024, Seattle police report that some users wrongly believe they are consuming higher-quality fentanyl. Xylazine's street name in Puerto Rico is anestesia de caballo, which translates to "horse anesthetic". From 2002 to 2008, its use was associated with a high number of inmate deaths at the Guerrero Correctional Institution in Aguadilla, Puerto Rico.

Xylazine's street name in the United States, particularly when it is mixed with medetomidine and/or fentanyl, is "tranq", "tranq dope" and "zombie drug".

As of 2012, xylazine users in Puerto Rico were more likely to be male, under age 30, living in a rural area, and injecting rather than inhaling xylazine. The combination of heroin and xylazine produces a potentially more deadly high than heroin alone. Xylazine is also frequently found in "speedball", a mixture of a stimulant drug such as cocaine with a depressant drug such as heroin, morphine and/or fentanyl. As of 2012, causal factors underlying xylazine's increasing popularity were still unknown.

As of 2022, more information on the distribution of xylazine in the body, physical symptoms, and factors predictive of chronic use was known: frequency of use depended on social or economic factors, as well as each user's subjective response to the drug's addictive properties. From November 2021 until August 2022, 80% of drug paraphernalia which tested positive for fentanyl at needle exchange programs in Maryland also contained xylazine. As of 2022, xylazine was almost invariably combined with opioids when used recreationally, and the drug produced a characteristic withdrawal syndrome which complicates treatment of addicted users.

In April 2023, the Biden administration declared xylazine-laced fentanyl an official emerging drug threat to the nation, the first time such a label has been given. In 2022, the Drug Enforcement Administration (DEA) reported that 23% of seized fentanyl powder and 7% of fentanyl pills were found to have been adulterated with xylazine.

In July 2023, the first death following xylazine use outside of North America was reported to have taken place in Solihull, England on May 22. A 43-year-old male was found dead at home with postmortem toxicology detecting heroin, cocaine, fentanyl and xylazine.

=== Side effects ===
Xylazine overdose is often fatal in humans. Because it is used as a drug adulterant, the symptoms caused by the drugs accompanying xylazine administration vary between individuals.

The most common side-effects in humans associated with xylazine administration include bradycardia, respiratory depression, hypotension, transient hypertension secondary to α_{1}-adrenergic receptor stimulation, and other central and hemodynamic changes. Xylazine significantly decreases heart rate in animals that are not pre-medicated with medications that have anticholinergic effects.

Symptoms that can occur following overdose are areflexia, asthenia, ataxia, blurred vision, disorientation, dizziness, dysarthria, dysmetria, fainting, hyporeflexia, somnolence, coma, apnea, premature ventricular contraction, tachycardia, miosis, and hyperglycaemia. Rarely, hypotonia, urinary incontinence, and nonspecific electrocardiographic ST segment changes occur. Following a human overdose, symptoms can last for 8–72 hours, varying based on xylazine's combined usage with other drugs.

=== Overdose ===
Human tolerance to xylazine varies widely, with toxicity and fatality occurring between doses of 40–2,400 mg (0.62–37.04 gr). Non-fatal blood or plasma concentration ranges from 0.03 to 4.6 mg/L. In fatalities, the blood concentration of xylazine ranges from trace to 16 mg/L. It is reported that there is no defined safe or fatal concentration of xylazine because of the significant overlap between the non-fatal and postmortem blood concentrations of xylazine.

Hemodialysis has been suggested as a form of treatment, but is usually unfavorable due to the large volume of distribution of xylazine.

There are no standardized screenings to determine if an overdose has occurred. Detection of xylazine in humans involves various screening methods, such as urine screenings, thin layer chromatography (TLC), gas chromatography–mass spectrometry (GC-MS) and liquid chromatography–mass spectrometry (LC-MS). As of November 2022, detecting xylazine in a drug sample requires spectrophotometry.

As of 1998, the α_{2}-adrenergic receptor antagonist atipamezole was used to reverse the effects of xylazine or the related drug dexmedetomidine in veterinary medicine, but this is not an approved medical treatment for humans, despite Phase I clinical trials in 2005.

As of 2001, the effects of xylazine in animals were also reversed by the analeptics 4-aminopyridine, doxapram, and caffeine, which are physiological antagonists to central nervous system depressants. The ways to accurately identify chronic xylazine use are unknown, and the effective treatments, if any, are not standardized. As of 2014, multiple drugs have been used for therapeutic intervention, including lidocaine, naloxone, thiamine, lorazepam, vecuronium, etomidate, propofol, tolazoline, yohimbine, atropine, orciprenaline, metoclopramide, ranitidine, metoprolol, enoxaparin, flucloxacillin, insulin, and irrigation of both eyes with saline.

The treatment after a xylazine overdose primarily involves maintaining respiratory function and blood pressure. In cases of intoxication, physicians recommend intravenous fluid infusion, atropine, and hospital observation. Severe cases may require tracheal intubation, mechanical ventilation, gastric lavage, activated charcoal, bladder catheterization, electrocardiographic (ECG) and hyperglycemia monitoring. Physicians typically recommend which detoxification treatment should be used to manage possible dysfunction involving highly perfused organs such as the liver and kidneys.
