= 4-NEMD =

Chemical compound

Clinical data
- ATC code: None

Identifiers
- IUPAC name: (S)-4-(1-Naphthalen-1-ylethyl)-1H-imidazole
- CAS Number: 156833-39-5
- PubChem CID: 132110
- ChemSpider: 24531958
- UNII: H3R6PW4CUC
- CompTox Dashboard (EPA): DTXSID501237378

Chemical and physical data
- Formula: C_{15}H_{14}N_{2}
- Molar mass: 222.291 g·mol^{−1}
- 3D model (JSmol): Interactive image
- SMILES: CC(C1=CC=CC2=CC=CC=C21)C3=CN=CN3
- InChI: InChI=1S/C15H14N2/c1-11(15-9-16-10-17-15)13-8-4-6-12-5-2-3-7-14(12)13/h2-11H,1H3,(H,16,17)/t11-/m0/s1; Key:DZSQSLQSMKNVBV-NSHDSACASA-N

4-NEMD is a potent sedative drug which acts as a selective alpha-2 adrenergic receptor agonist. It is closely related to dexmedetomidine but is several times more potent. Like other alpha-2 agonists, it produces sedative and muscle relaxant effects but without producing respiratory depression. It is not currently used in medicine, but has been researched as the basis for a potential new generation of alpha-2 agonist drugs, which may have selectivity for the different subtypes of the alpha-2 receptor. It has two isomers, with the (S) isomer being the more potent, as with medetomidine. 4-NEMD was also investigated by the United States military as an anesthetic agent, most likely for use in surgery, but possibly also for use as a non-lethal incapacitating agent, although this has not been officially confirmed.
