= Medetomidine/vatinoxan =

Medication

- Chemical structures of medetomidine (top) and vatinoxan

Combination of
- Medetomidine: alpha2-adrenoceptor agonist
- Vatinoxan: alpha2-adrenoceptor antagonist

Clinical data
- Trade names: Zenalpha
- AHFS/Drugs.com: Veterinary Use; Veterinary Use
- License data: US DailyMed: Medetomidine and vatinoxan
- Routes of administration: Intramuscular
- ATC code: None

Legal status
- Legal status: CA: ℞-only; US: ℞-only; EU: Rx-only

Medetomidine/vatinoxan, sold under the brand name Zenalpha, is a veterinary fixed-dose combination medication used as a sedative and analgesic for dogs. It contains medetomidine, an alpha2-adrenoceptor agonist, as the hydrochloride salt; and vatinoxan, an alpha2-adrenoceptor antagonist, as the hydrochloride salt.

It was approved for veterinary use in the United States in May 2022, and in Canada in May 2023.

== Veterinary use ==
Medetomidine/vatinoxan is indicated for use as a sedative and analgesic in dogs to facilitate clinical examination, clinical procedures and minor surgical procedures.

Medetomidine/vatinoxan is used for sedation of dogs. It is only approved for standalone use. A manufacturer trial found medetomidine/vatinoxan to have a faster onset and shorter duration of sedation with less respiratory depression and cardiovascular side effects as compared to medetomidine in dogs.
