= Alpha-2 adrenergic receptor =

Protein family

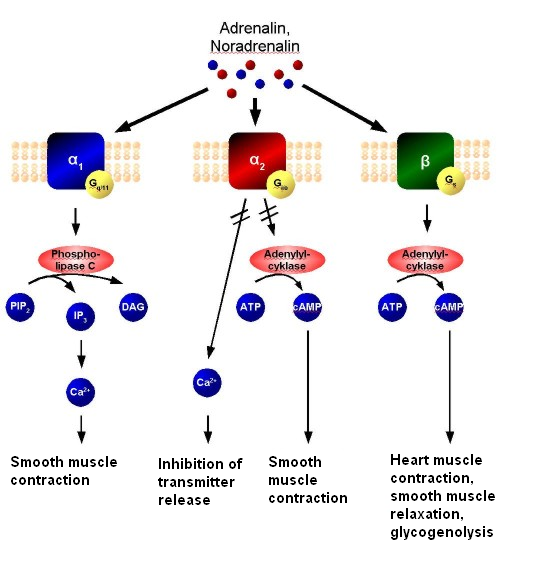

The alpha-2 (α_{2}) adrenergic receptor (or adrenoceptor) is a G protein-coupled receptor (GPCR) associated with the G_{i} heterotrimeric G-protein. It consists of three homologous subtypes, α_{2A}-, α_{2B}-, and α_{2C}-adrenergic. Some species other than humans express a fourth α_{2D}-adrenergic receptor as well. Catecholamines like norepinephrine (noradrenaline) and epinephrine (adrenaline) signal through the α_{2}-adrenergic receptor in the central and peripheral nervous systems.

== Cellular localization ==
The α_{2A} adrenergic receptor is localised in the following central nervous system (CNS) structures:

- Brainstem (especially the locus coeruleus as presynaptic & somatodendritic autoreceptor)
- Midbrain
- Hypothalamus
- Olfactory system
- Hippocampus
- Spinal cord
- Cerebral cortex
- Cerebellum
- Septum

Whereas the α_{2B} adrenergic receptor is localised in the following CNS structures:

- Thalamus
- Stratum pyramidale of the hippocampus
- Cerebellar Purkinje layer

The α_{2C} adrenergic receptor is localised in the following CNS structures:

- Midbrain
- Thalamus
- Amygdala
- Dorsal root ganglia
- Olfactory system
- Hippocampus
- Cerebral cortex
- Basal ganglia
- Substantia nigra
- Ventral tegmentum

== Effects ==
The α_{2}-adrenergic receptor is classically located on vascular prejunctional terminals where it inhibits the release of norepinpehrine (noradrenaline) in a form of negative feedback. It is also located on the vascular smooth muscle cells of certain blood vessels, such as those found in skin arterioles or on veins, where it sits alongside the more plentiful α_{1}-adrenergic receptor. The α_{2}-adrenergic receptor binds both norepinephrine released by sympathetic postganglionic fibers and epinephrine (adrenaline) released by the adrenal medulla, binding norepinephrine with slightly higher affinity. It has several general functions in common with the α_{1}-adrenergic receptor, but also has specific effects of its own. Agonists (activators) of the α_{2}-adrenergic receptor are frequently used in anaesthesia where they affect sedation, muscle relaxation and analgesia through effects on the central nervous system (CNS).

In the brain, α_{2}-adrenergic receptors can be localized either pre- or post-synaptically, however the majority of receptors appear to be post-synaptic. For example, the α_{2A} adrenergic receptor subtype is post-synaptic in the prefrontal cortex, where these receptors strengthen cognitive and executive functions by inhibiting cyclic adenosine monophosphate (cAMP) opening of potassium channels, thus enhancing prefrontal connections and neuronal firing. The α_{2A}-adrenergic agonist, guanfacine, is now used to treat prefrontal cortical cognitive disorders such as attention deficit hyperactivity disorder (ADHD).

=== General ===
Common effects include:

- Suppression of release of norepinephrine (noradrenaline) by negative feedback
- Transient hypertension (increase in blood pressure), followed by a sustained hypotension (decrease in blood pressure)
- Vasoconstriction of certain arteries
- Vasoconstriction of arteries to heart (coronary artery); however, the extent of this effect may be limited and may be negated by the vasodilatory effect from β_{2} receptors
- Constriction of some vascular smooth muscle
- Venoconstriction of veins
- Decrease motility of smooth muscle in gastrointestinal tract
- Inhibition of lipolysis
- Facilitation of the cognitive functions associated with the prefrontal cortex (PFC; working memory, attention, executive functioning, etc.)
- Sedation
- Analgesia

=== Individual ===
Individual actions of the α_{2} receptor include:

- Mediates synaptic transmission in pre- and postsynaptic nerve terminals
  - Decrease release of acetylcholine
  - Decrease release of norepinephrine
    - Inhibit norepinephrine system in brain
- Inhibition of lipolysis in adipose tissue
- Inhibition of insulin release in pancreas
- Induction of glucagon release from pancreas
- Platelet aggregation
- Contraction of sphincters of the gastrointestinal tract
- Decreased secretion from salivary gland
- Relax gastrointestinal tract (presynaptic effect)
- Decreased aqueous humor fluid production from the ciliary body

== Signaling cascade ==
The α subunit of an inhibitory G protein - G_{i} dissociates from the G protein, and associates with adenylyl cyclase. This causes the inactivation of adenylyl cyclase, resulting in a decrease of cAMP produced from ATP, which leads to a decrease of intracellular cAMP. PKA is, as a result, not able to be activated by cAMP, so proteins such as phosphorylase kinase cannot be phosphorylated by PKA. In particular, phosphorylase kinase is responsible for the phosphorylation and activation of glycogen phosphorylase, an enzyme necessary for glycogen breakdown. Thus in this pathway, the downstream effect of adenylyl cyclase inactivation is decreased breakdown of glycogen.

The relaxation of gastrointestinal tract motility is by presynaptic inhibition, where transmitters inhibit further release by homotropic effects.

== Ligands ==
=== Agonists ===
- 4-NEMD
- 7-Me-marsanidine (also I_{1} agonist)
- Agmatine (also I agonist, NMDA, 5-HT_{3}, nicotinic antagonist and NOS inhibitor)
- Apraclonidine
- Brimonidine
- Cannabigerol (also acts as a moderate affinity 5-HT_{1A} receptor antagonist, and low affinity CB1 receptor antagonist).
- Clonidine (also I_{1} agonist)
- Detomidine
- Dexmedetomidine
- Fadolmidine
- Guanabenz
- Guanfacine
- Lofexidine
- Marsanidine
- Medetomidine
- Methyldopa
- Mivazerol
- Oxymetazoline (also α_{1} agonist)
- Rilmenidine (also I agonist)
- Romifidine
- Talipexole (also dopamine agonist)
- Tasipimidine
- TDIQ (MDTHIQ, MDA-CR)
- Tiamenidine
- Tizanidine
- Tolonidine
- Xylazine
- Xylometazoline

Norepinephrine has higher affinity for the α_{2} receptor than epinephrine does, and therefore relates less to the latter's functions. Nonselective α_{2} agonists include the antihypertensive drug clonidine, which can be used to lower blood pressure and to reduce hot flashes associated with menopause. Clonidine has shown positive results in children with ADHD who have tics resulting from the treatment with a CNS stimulant drug, such as Adderall XR or methylphenidate; clonidine also helps alleviate symptoms of opioid withdrawal. The hypotensive effect of clonidine was initially attributed through its agonist action on presynaptic α_{2} receptors, which act as a down-regulator on the amount of norepinephrine released in the synaptic cleft, an example of an autoreceptor. However, it is now known that clonidine binds to imidazoline receptors with a much greater affinity than α_{2} receptors, which would account for its applications outside the field of hypertension alone. Imidazoline receptors occur in the nucleus tractus solitarii and also the centrolateral medulla. Clonidine is now thought to decrease blood pressure via this central mechanism. Other nonselective agonists include dexmedetomidine, lofexidine (another antihypertensive), TDIQ (partial agonist), tizanidine (in spasms, cramping) and xylazine. Xylazine has veterinary use.

In the European Union, dexmedetomidine received a marketing authorization from the European Medicines Agency (EMA) on August 10, 2012, under the brand name of Dexdor. It is indicated for sedation in the ICU for patients needing mechanical ventilation.

In non-human species this is an immobilizing and anesthetic drug, presumptively also mediated by α_{2} adrenergic receptors because it is reversed by yohimbine, an α_{2} antagonist.

α_{2A} selective agonists include guanfacine (a antihypertensive) and brimonidine (UK 14,304).

(R)-3-nitrobiphenyline is an α_{2C} selective agonist as well as being a weak antagonist at the α_{2A} and α_{2B} subtypes.

=== Antagonists ===
- 1-PP (active metabolite of buspirone and gepirone)
- Aripiprazole
- Asenapine
- Atipamezole
- Cirazoline
- Clozapine
- Efaroxan
- Fipamezole
- Idazoxan
- Lurasidone
- Melperone
- Mianserin
- Mirtazapine
- Napitane
- Olanzapine
- Paliperidone (also primary active metabolite of risperidone)
- Phenoxybenzamine
- Phentolamine
- Piribedil
- Rauwolscine
- Risperidone
- Rotigotine (α_{2B} antagonist, non-selective)
- Quetiapine
- Norquetiapine (primary active metabolite of quetiapine)
- Setiptiline
- Tolazoline
- Yohimbine
- Ziprasidone
- Zotepine (discontinued)

Non-selective α blockers include, A-80426, atipamezole, phenoxybenzamine, efaroxan, idazoxan (experimental), and SB-269,970.

Yohimbine is a relatively selective α_{2} blocker that has been investigated as a treatment for erectile dysfunction.

Tetracyclic antidepressants mirtazapine and mianserin are also potent α antagonists with mirtazapine being more selective for α_{2} subtype (~30-fold selective over α_{1}) than mianserin (~17-fold).

α_{2A} selective blockers include BRL-44408 and RX-821,002.

α_{2B} selective blockers include ARC-239 and imiloxan.

α_{2C} selective blockers include JP-1302 and spiroxatrine, the latter also being a serotonin 5-HT_{1A} antagonist.

Binding affinity (K_{i} in nM) and clinical data on a number of alpha-2 ligands
Drug	α_{1A}	α_{1B}	α_{1D}	α_{2A}	α_{2B}	α_{2C}	Indication(s)	Route of Administration	Bioavailability	Elimination half-life	Metabolising enzymes	Protein binding
Agonists
Clonidine	316.23	316.23	125.89	42.92	106.31	233.1	Hypertension, ADHD, analgesia, sedation	Oral, epidural, transdermal	75–85% (IR), 89% (XR)	12–16 h	CYP2D6	20–40%
Dexmedetomidine	199.53	316.23	79.23	6.13	18.46	37.72	Procedural and ICU sedation	IV	100%	6 minutes		94%
Guanfacine	?	?	?	71.81	1200.2	2505.2	Hypertension, ADHD	Oral	80–100% (IR), 58% (XR)	17 h (IR), 18 h (XR)	CYP3A4	70%
Xylazine	?	?	?	5754.4	3467.4	>10000	Veterinary sedation	?	?	?	?	?
Xylometazoline	?	?	?	15.14	1047.13	128.8	Nasal congestion	Intranasal	?	?	?	?
Antagonists
Asenapine	1.2	?	?	1.2	0.32	1.2	Schizophrenia, bipolar disorder	Sublingual	35%	24 h	CYP1A2 & UGT1A4	95%
Clozapine	1.62	7	?	37	25	6	Treatment-resistant schizophrenia	Oral	50–60%	12 h	CYP1A2, CYP3A4, CYP2D6	97%
Mianserin	74	?	?	4.8	27	3.8	Depression	Oral	20%	21–61 h	CYP3A4	95%
Mirtazapine	500	?	?	20	?	18	Depression	Oral	50%	20–40 h	CYP1A2, CYP2D6, CYP3A4	85%

== See also ==
- Adrenergic receptor
- G protein-coupled receptor
