= Opevesostat =

Chemical compound

Clinical data
- Other names: MK-5684, ODM-208

Identifiers
- IUPAC name: 2-(1,3-dihydroisoindol-2-ylmethyl)-5-[(1-methylsulfonylpiperidin-4-yl)methoxy]pyran-4-one
- CAS Number: 2231294-96-3
- PubChem CID: 135151902
- ChemSpider: 128942316
- UNII: 1Z7MAV4KQC
- KEGG: D13110
- ChEMBL: ChEMBL5314533

Chemical and physical data
- Formula: C_{21}H_{26}N_{2}O_{5}S
- Molar mass: 418.51 g·mol^{−1}
- 3D model (JSmol): Interactive image
- SMILES: CS(=O)(=O)N1CCC(CC1)COC2=COC(=CC2=O)CN3CC4=CC=CC=C4C3
- InChI: InChI=InChI=1S/C21H26N2O5S/c1-29(25,26)23-8-6-16(7-9-23)14-28-21-15-27-19(10-20(21)24)13-22-11-17-4-2-3-5-18(17)12-22/h2-5,10,15-16H,6-9,11-14H2,1H3; Key:LHVKCOBGLZGRQZ-UHFFFAOYSA-N

Opevesostat is an investigational new drug being developed for the treatment of metastatic castration-resistant prostate cancer (mCRPC). It is a steroidogenesis inhibitor, selectively targeting CYP11A1 (cholesterol side-chain cleavage enzyme) discovered by Orion Corporation and currently undergoing clinical development by Merck & Co., Inc. Opevesostat's mechanism of action involves suppressing the production of steroid hormones and their precursors that may activate the androgen receptor signaling pathway, which is crucial in prostate cancer progression. As of 2024, opevesostat is being evaluated in two Phase 3 clinical trials, OMAHA-003 and OMAHA-004 which are assessing its efficacy and safety in combination with hormone replacement therapy for patients with mCRPC who have failed prior treatments.
