= Fadolmidine =

Experimental drug

Clinical data
- Other names: MPV-2426; Radolmidine
- ATC code: none

Legal status
- Legal status: Not approved

Identifiers
- IUPAC name: N-[4-(acridin-9-ylamino)phenyl]-2-phenylacetamide
- CAS Number: 189353-32-0
- PubChem CID: 44336989
- ChemSpider: 23192404
- UNII: S3709T25V6
- ChEMBL: ChEMBL325311

Chemical and physical data
- Formula: C_{13}H_{14}N_{2}O
- Molar mass: 214.268 g·mol^{−1}
- 3D model (JSmol): Interactive image
- SMILES: C1=CC=C(C=C1)CC(=O)NC2=CC=C(C=C2)NC3=C4C=CC=CC4=NC5=CC=CC=C53
- InChI: InChI=1S/C27H21N3O/c31-26(18-19-8-2-1-3-9-19)28-20-14-16-21(17-15-20)29-27-22-10-4-6-12-24(22)30-25-13-7-5-11-23(25)27/h1-17H,18H2,(H,28,31)(H,29,30); Key:KFOZTMBTDOTLMI-UHFFFAOYSA-N

Fadolmidine (development code MPV-2426) is an experimental α_{2} adrenergic receptor agonist that has been investigated as a spinal analgesic. It was developed with the aim of providing antinociceptive effects with reduced systemic side effects compared to other α_{2} agonists.

== Pharmacology ==
Fadolmidine acts as a selective α_{2} adrenergic receptor agonist, a receptor class associated with modulation of nociceptive signalling. A 2004 review described preclinical evidence of spinal antinociceptive effects in laboratory models and suggested a reduced propensity for sedation compared with systemic α_{2} agonists.

== Development ==
The compound was developed under the code MPV-2426. As of 2025, it has no approved medical indication and has not advanced to late-stage clinical development.

== Chemistry ==
Fadolmidine is an imidazole-derived compound structurally related to other α_{2} agonists such as medetomidine and dexmedetomidine.
