= Orion Corporation (Finnish company) =

Finnish pharmaceutical company

- Native name: Orion Oyj
- Type: Julkinen osakeyhtiö
- Traded as: Nasdaq Helsinki: ORNAV; Nasdaq Helsinki: ORNBV; OMXH25 component
- Industry: Pharmaceutical industry
- Founded: 21 September 1917; 109 years ago
- Headquarters: Espoo, Finland
- Key people: Liisa Hurme (President and CEO), Mikael Silvennoinen (Chairman)
- Products: Pharmaceuticals and active pharmaceutical ingredients
- Revenue: ▲€1.89 billion (2025)
- Operating income: ▲€632 million (2025)
- Net income: ▲€500 million (2025)
- Total assets: ▲€2.01 billion (2025)
- Total equity: ▲€1.28 billion (2025)
- Number of employees: ▲4,029 (2025)
- Website: www.orionpharma.com

Orion Corporation (Finnish: Orion Oyj), founded in 1917 and headquartered at Espoo, Finland, is a globally operating Finnish company which develops, manufactures and markets human and veterinary pharmaceuticals and active pharmaceutical ingredients for global markets. All of the company's manufacturing sites and the majority of its R&D units are in Finland.

Orion's class A and B shares are listed on the Helsinki Stock Exchange.

== History ==
Orion was founded on September 21, 1917 by pharmacists Onni Turpeinen, Eemil Tuurala and Wikki Valkama. Before founding Orion, they worked in a pharmaceutical-chemical factory called Medica. The first premises of the new company were found in a courtyard building in Helsinki's Kruununhaka, Mariankatu 24, i.e. Asunto Oy Mars star. Among the first products of the apothecary were Ballistol gun oil and dulcine. Pediatrician Arvo Ylppö played a significant role starting in the 1920s.

Orion's diagnostics business was previously concentrated in the Orion Diagnostica profit unit, which was sold to a private equity investor in April 2018. The diagnostics business included the development, manufacture and marketing of diagnostic tests and hygiene tests. Orion Diagnostica changed its name in November 2019 and is now Aidian.

== Notable products ==
The following are Orion's top-selling product lines as of March 2021.

Trade name	Generic name	Indication
Stalevo, Comtess/ Comtan	Entacapone	Parkinson's disease
Easyhaler	multi-dose dry-powder inhaler for asthma.	asthma, COPD
Simdax	Levosimendan	acute heart failure
dexdor	dexmedetomidine	intensive care sedative
Dexdomitor	dexmedetomidine	animal sedative
Domitor	medetomidine	animal sedative
Domosedan	detomidine	animal sedative
Antisedan	atipamezole	reversing agent
Nubeqa	Darolutamide	non-metastatic castration-resistant prostate cancer
Solomet	Methylprednisolone	inflammation
Divina series	Estradiol valerate and Medroxyprogesterone acetate	hormone replacement against menopausal symptoms
Fareston	Toremifene	Selective estrogen receptor modulator
Burana	ibuprofen	inflammatory pain
Marevan	warfarin	anticoagulant
