= Atipamezole =

Veterinary medication

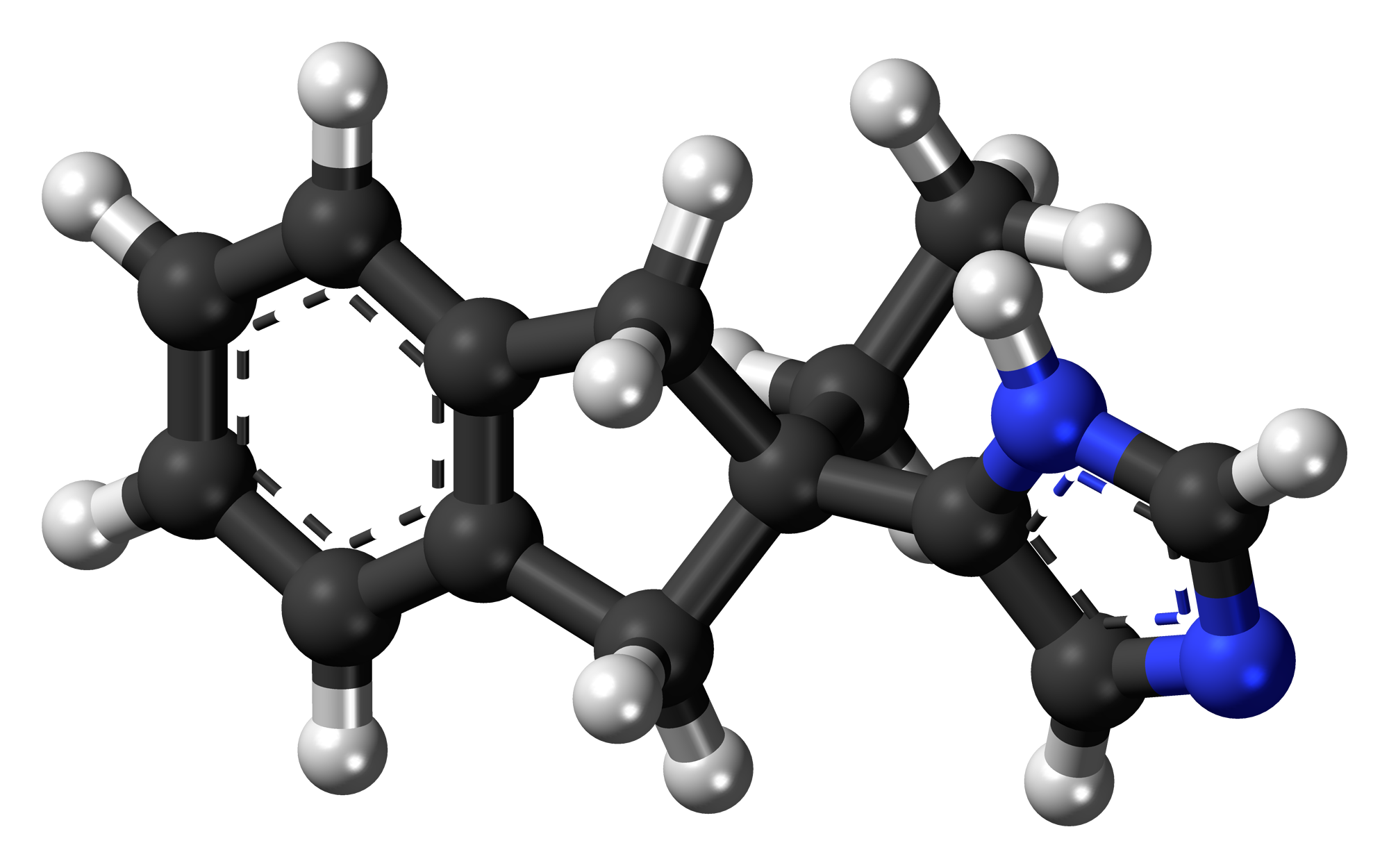

Clinical data
- Trade names: Antisedan, others
- AHFS/Drugs.com: Veterinary Use; Veterinary Use
- License data: US DailyMed: Atipamezole
- Routes of administration: Intramuscular
- Drug class: Reversal agent
- ATCvet code: QV03AB90 (WHO)

Legal status
- Legal status: CA: ℞-only; US: ℞-only

Pharmacokinetic data
- Metabolism: Liver
- Onset of action: Less than 3 min.
- Elimination half-life: 2.6 hours (dogs)
- Excretion: Kidney

Identifiers
- IUPAC name: 4-(2-Ethyl-1,3-dihydroinden-2-yl)-3H-imidazole
- CAS Number: 104054-27-5
- PubChem CID: 71310
- DrugBank: DB11481
- ChemSpider: 64427
- UNII: 03N9U5JAF6
- KEGG: D03002
- CompTox Dashboard (EPA): DTXSID2049135

Chemical and physical data
- Formula: C_{14}H_{16}N_{2}
- Molar mass: 212.296 g·mol^{−1}
- 3D model (JSmol): Interactive image
- SMILES: [nH]1cc(nc1)C3(Cc2c(cccc2)C3)CC
- InChI: InChI=1S/C14H16N2/c1-2-14(13-9-15-10-16-13)7-11-5-3-4-6-12(11)8-14/h3-6,9-10H,2,7-8H2,1H3,(H,15,16); Key:HSWPZIDYAHLZDD-UHFFFAOYSA-N

Atipamezole, sold under the brand name Antisedan among others, is a synthetic α_{2} adrenergic receptor antagonist used for the reversal of the sedative and analgesic effects of dexmedetomidine and medetomidine in dogs and cats as well is xylazine in cattle and horses. Its reversal effect works by competing with the sedative for α_{2}-adrenergic receptors and displacing them. It is mainly used in veterinary medicine, and while it is only licensed for dogs and for intramuscular use, it has been used intravenously, as well as in cats and other animals (intravenous use in cats and dogs is not recommended due to the potential for cardiovascular collapse. This occurs due to profound hypotension caused by reversal of the alpha 1 effects while the reflex bradycardia is still in effect.). There is a low rate of side effects, largely due to atipamezole's high specificity for the α_{2}-adrenergic receptor. Atipamezole has a very quick onset, usually waking an animal up within 5 to 10 minutes.

It was originally released in 1996. It is available in as a generic medication.

== Veterinary use ==
Atipamezole was first sold in 1996 as a reversal agent for medetomidine. Although developed specifically for medetomidine it also reverses other alpha_{2} adrenergic receptor agonists. While it reverses both the sedative and analgesic (pain-relieving) effects of dexmedetomidine, atipamezole may not entirely reverse the cardiovascular depression that dexmedetomidine causes.

Atipamezole is licensed in the United States for intramuscular injection (IM) in dogs; it is, however, used off-label in cats, rabbits, and farm animals such as horses and cows, as well as in zoo medicine for reptiles (including tortoises, turtles, and alligators), armadillos, hippopotamuses, giraffes, okapi, and others. It has been given intravenously (IV), subcutaneously, intraperitoneally and, in red-eared sliders, intranasally. Atipamezole has mostly displaced yohimbine and tolazoline in small animal medicine but not large animal medicine.

Atipamezole has also been used as an antidote for various toxicities in dogs. For example, the anti-tick medication amitraz is commonly ingested by dogs who eat their anti-tick collars. Amitraz works by the same mechanism as dexmedetomidine and is thus easily reversed by atipamezole. Atipamezole also reverses the hypotension caused by tizanidine (a muscle relaxant) toxicity, and relieves toxicity from decongestants such as ephedrine and pseudoephedrine.

Intramuscular administration of atipamezole in the dog has quick absorption with the drug's half-life elimination being an hour following IM administration. In the dog atipamezole is metabolised in the liver by hydroxylation.

=== Available forms ===
Atipamezole is sold at 5 mg/mL for ease of use: 5 times as much atipamezole as medetomidine is needed for full reversal, and because medetomidine is sold as 1 mg/mL, 1 mL of atipamezole reverses 1 mL of medetomidine. When the enantiomerically pure version of medetomidine (dexmedetomidine) was released, it was sold at 0.5 mg/mL, because it was twice as strong as medetomidine. As such, 1 mL of atipamezole also reverses 1 mL of dexmedetomidine.

=== Specific populations ===
Atipamezole is not recommended for animals that are pregnant, lactating, or slated for breeding.

== Contraindications ==
While there are no absolute contraindications to atipamezole, it is recommended against being given with anticholinergics, as both can cause dramatic increases in heart rate. Atipamezole should also not be given too soon after an animal has been given dexmedetomidine mixed with ketamine or telazol(tiletamine); because it reverses only the dexmedetomidine, the ketamine or telazol will still be active, and the animal can wake up excited, delirious, and with muscle contractions. Some recommend not using it in dogs sedated with ketamine at all, since they can convulse due to the excitement effect.

== Side effects ==
Atipamezole's low rate of side effects is due to its high specificity for ɑ_{2}-adrenergic receptors; it has very little affinity for ɑ_{1}-adrenergic receptors and no affinity for most serotonin, muscarinic, and dopamine receptors. There is occasional vomiting, hypersalivation, and diarrhea. It can potentially cause CNS excitement, which can lead to tremors, tachycardia (increased heart rate), and vasodilation. The vasodilation leads to a transient decrease in blood pressure, which (in dogs) increases to normal within 10 minutes. There have been reports of transient hypoxemia. The chance of side effect can be minimized by administering atipamezole slowly.

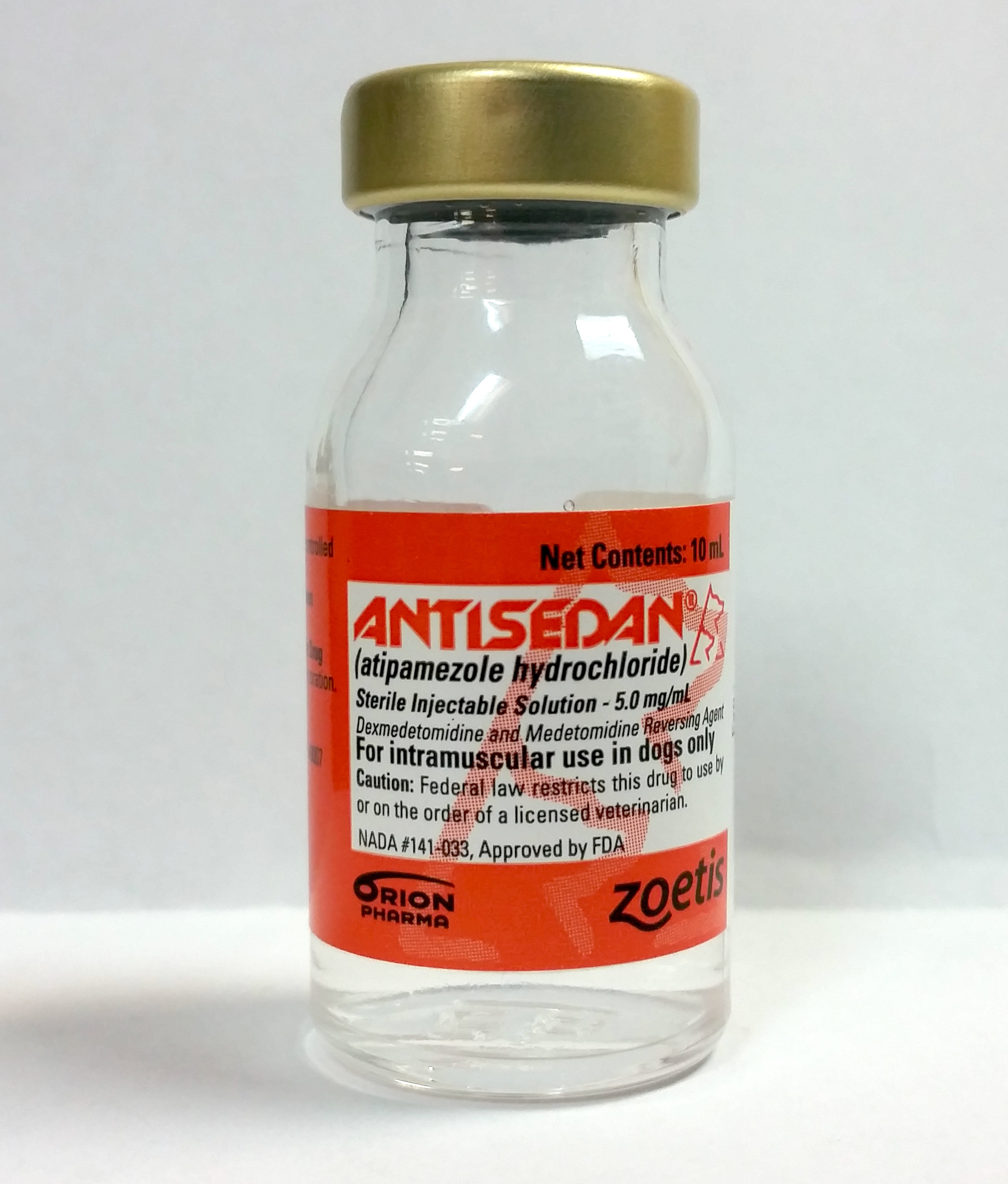
Atipamezole is sold as Antisedan.

There is a possibility of the sedation reversing abruptly, leading to nervous, aggressive, or delirious dogs. Such cases are more associated with intravenous administration (which has a faster onset than IM administration). The rapid administration of atipamezole leads to sudden displacement of dexmedetomidine from peripheral ɑ_{2}-adrenergic receptors; this can cause a sudden drop in blood pressure, which is followed by a reflex tachycardia and hypertension.

There have been some cases where intravenous administration of atipamezole lead to death via cardiovascular collapse. This is thought to be combination of sudden hypotension added onto the low heart rate caused by sedatives.

There is some possibility of the animal relapsing into sedation after being given atipamezole, made more likely if the original sedative was given intravenously.

Rats and monkeys have experienced increased sexual activity after being given atipamezole.

== Overdose ==
The LD_{50} of atipamezole for rats is 44 mg/kg when given subcutaneously. The minimum lethal dose in dogs is over 5 mg/m^{2}; dogs have tolerated getting ten times the standard dose. Signs of overdose include panting, trembling, vomiting, and diarrhea, as well as increased blood levels of creatine kinase, aspartate transaminase, and alanine transaminase. Dogs who received atipamezole without first receiving dexmedetomidine have shown no clinical signs other than mild muscle tremors.

== Pharmacology ==
=== Mechanism of action ===
The structures of dexmedetomidine and atipamezole, with the similarities in blue.

Atipamezole is a competitive antagonist at ɑ_{2}-adrenergic receptors that competes with dexmedetomidine, an ɑ_{2}-adrenergic receptors agonist. It does not directly interact with dexmedetomidine; rather, their structural similarity allows atipamezole to easily compete for receptor binding sites.

Atipamezole reverses analgesia by blocking norepinephrine feedback inhibition on nociceptors.

Site	K_{i} (nM)	Species	Ref
α_{1}	3160	Human	
α_{2A}	1.9	Human	
α_{2B}	2.2	Human	
α_{2C}	4.2	Human	
The K_{i} refers to a drug's affinity for a receptor. The smaller the K_{i}, the higher the affinity for that receptor.

=== Pharmacokinetics ===
Out of the three ɑ_{2}-antagonists commonly used in veterinary medicine (atipamezole, yohimbine, and tolazine), atipamezole shows the highest preference for ɑ_{2}- over ɑ_{1}-receptors, binding to them with a ratio of 8526:1. It shows no preference for a particular ɑ_{2}-receptor subtype.

Atipamezole has a rapid onset: it reverses the decreased heart rate caused by sedation within three minutes. The animal usually begins waking up within 5–10 minutes. In a study of over 100 dogs, more than half could stand up within 5 minutes, and 96% could stand up within 15. Atipamezole reaches maximum serum concentration within 10 minutes of IM administration. Atipamezole is distributed extensively to the tissues; at a particular time, concentrations in the brain reach two to three times the concentration in the plasma.

Atipamezole undergoes heavy first-pass metabolism in the liver, which includes the glucuronidation at nitrogen during. Metabolites are mostly excreted in the urine.

The elimination half-life is 2.6 hours in dogs and 1.3 hours rats.

== Research ==
Atipamezole's effects on cognitive function have been studied in rats and in humans. While low doses in rats improved alertness, selective attention, learning, and recall, higher doses generally impaired cognitive function (most likely due to norepinephrine overactivity). In rats, it has also been shown to improve cognitive function decreased by strokes or brain lesions. Studies in humans have found it to increase focus but decrease multitasking abilities. Atipamezole has also been researched in humans as a potential anti-Parkinsonian.

Because atipamezole increases sexual activity in monkeys, there have been claims of its potential to treat erectile dysfunction.
