= Tiamenidine =

Chemical compound

Clinical data
- Trade names: Sundralen, Symcorad, Symcor
- ATC code: C02AC (WHO)

Pharmacokinetic data
- Elimination half-life: 2.3–5 hours

Identifiers
- IUPAC name: N-(2-chloro-4-methylthiophen-3-yl)-4,5-dihydro-1H-imidazol-2-amine
- CAS Number: 31428-61-2
- PubChem CID: 39974
- ChemSpider: 36548
- UNII: 195V08O55G
- KEGG: D06127
- ChEMBL: ChEMBL295409
- CompTox Dashboard (EPA): DTXSID80185349

Chemical and physical data
- Formula: C_{8}H_{10}ClN_{3}S
- Molar mass: 215.70 g·mol^{−1}
- 3D model (JSmol): Interactive image
- SMILES: Clc2scc(c2N/C1=N/CCN1)C
- InChI: InChI=1S/C8H10ClN3S/c1-5-4-13-7(9)6(5)12-8-10-2-3-11-8/h4H,2-3H2,1H3,(H2,10,11,12); Key:CVWILQHZFWRYPB-UHFFFAOYSA-N

Tiamenidine (BAN, USAN, INN, also known as thiamenidine, Hoe 440) is an imidazoline compound that shares many of the pharmacological properties of clonidine. It is a centrally-acting α_{2} adrenergic receptor agonist (IC_{50} = 9.1 nM). It also acts as an α_{1}-adrenergic receptor agonist to a far lesser extent (IC_{50} = 4.85 μM). In hypertensive volunteers, like clonidine, it significantly increased sinus node recovery time and lowered cardiac output. It was marketed (as tiamenidine hydrochloride) by Sanofi-Aventis under the brand name Sundralen for the management of essential hypertension.

== Synthesis ==
ChemDrug Synthesis: Patent:

Reaction of thiourea 1 with methyl iodide gives the corresponding S-methyl analogue (2), followed by heating with ethylenediamine, completes the synthesis of tiamenidine (3).

== See also ==
- Clonidine
- Tizanidine
