= Guanabenz =

Medication used to treat high blood pressure

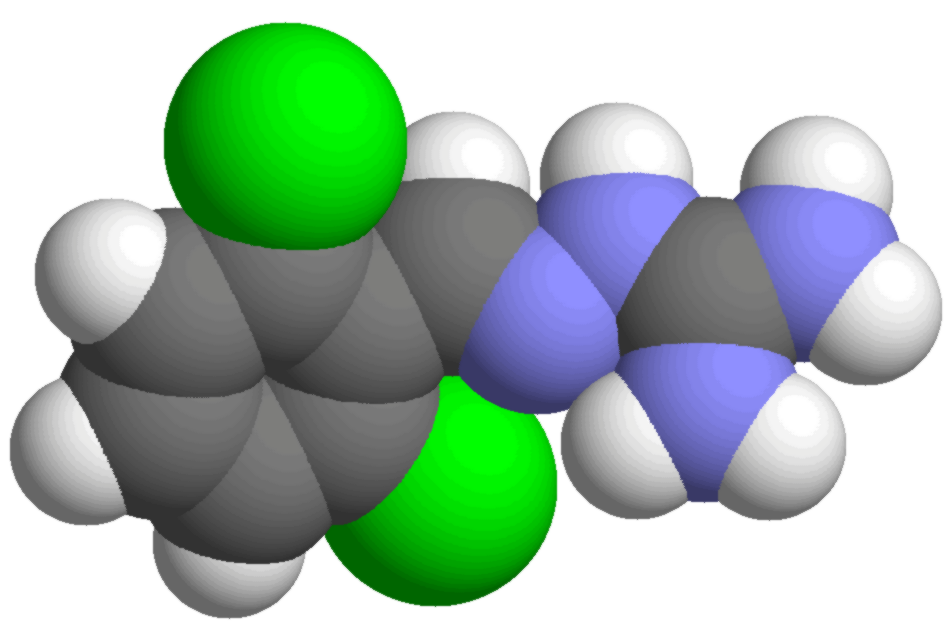

Clinical data
- Trade names: Wytensin
- AHFS/Drugs.com: Consumer Drug Information
- MedlinePlus: a686003
- ATC code: none

Pharmacokinetic data
- Protein binding: 90%
- Elimination half-life: 6 hours

Identifiers
- IUPAC name: 2-(2,6-dichlorobenzylidene)hydrazinecarboximidamide
- CAS Number: 5051-62-7
- PubChem CID: 5702063
- IUPHAR/BPS: 5443
- DrugBank: DB00629
- ChemSpider: 4642445
- UNII: GGD30112WC
- KEGG: D04375
- ChEMBL: ChEMBL420
- CompTox Dashboard (EPA): DTXSID6045666
- ECHA InfoCard: 100.023.410

Chemical and physical data
- Formula: C_{8}H_{8}Cl_{2}N_{4}
- Molar mass: 231.08 g·mol^{−1}
- 3D model (JSmol): Interactive image
- SMILES: Clc1cccc(Cl)c1\C=N\N=C(/N)N
- InChI: InChI=1S/C8H8Cl2N4/c9-6-2-1-3-7(10)5(6)4-13-14-8(11)12/h1-4H,(H4,11,12,14)/b13-4+; Key:WDZVGELJXXEGPV-YIXHJXPBSA-N

Guanabenz (pronounced GWAHN-a-benz, sold under the trade name Wytensin) is an alpha agonist that is selective to the alpha-2 adrenergic receptor. Guanabenz is used as an antihypertensive drug used in the treatment of high blood pressure (hypertension).

The most common side effects during guanabenz therapy are dizziness, drowsiness, dry mouth, headache and weakness.

Guanabenz can make one drowsy or less alert, therefore driving or operating dangerous machinery is not recommended.

== Research ==
Guanabenz selectively binds a regulatory subunit of protein phosphatase 1, inhibiting stress-induced dephosphorylation of eIF2α and thereby prolonging activation of the integrated stress response. This activity of Guanabenz is separate from its adrenergic activity and was proposed as a possible treatment against many neurodegenerative diseases, including amyotrophic lateral sclerosis.

Guanabenz also been shown to have anti-inflammatory properties in different pathological situations, including multiple sclerosis.

Guanabenz has also found to potentially slow down vanishing white matter disease (VWM).

== See also ==
- Guanoxabenz
- Guanfacine
