= Quetiapine =

Atypical antipsychotic medication

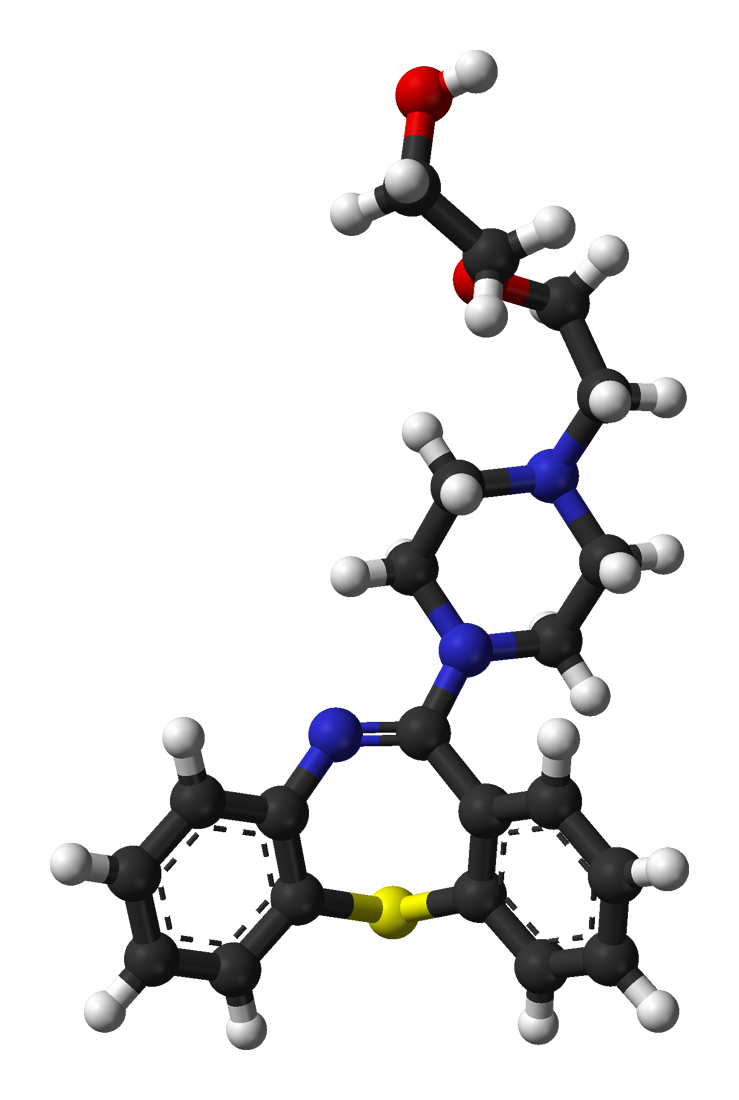

Clinical data
- Pronunciation: /kwɪˈtaɪ.əpiːn/ kwi-TY-ə-peen
- Trade names: Seroquel, Seroquel Xr, others
- AHFS/Drugs.com: Monograph
- MedlinePlus: a698019
- License data: US DailyMed: Quetiapine
- Pregnancy category: AU: B3
- Routes of administration: By mouth
- Drug class: Atypical antipsychotic
- ATC code: N05AH04 (WHO)

Legal status
- Legal status: AU: S4 (Prescription only); BR: Class C1 (Other controlled substances); CA: ℞-only; NZ: Prescription only; UK: POM (Prescription only); US: ℞-only

Pharmacokinetic data
- Bioavailability: 100%
- Protein binding: 83%
- Metabolism: Liver via CYP3A4-catalysed sulfoxidation to its active metabolite norquetiapine (N-desalkylquetiapine)
- Elimination half-life: 7 hours (parent compound); 9–12 hours (active metabolite, norquetiapine)
- Excretion: Kidney (73%), feces (20%)

Identifiers
- IUPAC name: 2-(2-(4-Dibenzo[b,f][1,4]thiazepine-11-yl-1-piperazinyl)ethoxy)ethanol
- CAS Number: 111974-69-7
- PubChem CID: 5002
- IUPHAR/BPS: 50
- DrugBank: DB01224
- ChemSpider: 4827
- UNII: BGL0JSY5SI
- KEGG: D08456
- ChEBI: CHEBI:8707
- ChEMBL: ChEMBL716
- CompTox Dashboard (EPA): DTXSID9023546
- ECHA InfoCard: 100.131.193

Chemical and physical data
- Formula: C_{21}H_{25}N_{3}O_{2}S
- Molar mass: 383.51 g·mol^{−1}
- 3D model (JSmol): Interactive image
- Solubility in water: 3.29 mg/mL (20 °C)
- SMILES: N\1=C(\c3c(Sc2c/1cccc2)cccc3)N4CCN(CCOCCO)CC4
- InChI: InChI=1S/C21H25N3O2S/c25-14-16-26-15-13-23-9-11-24(12-10-23)21-17-5-1-3-7-19(17)27-20-8-4-2-6-18(20)22-21/h1-8,25H,9-16H2; Key:URKOMYMAXPYINW-UHFFFAOYSA-N

Quetiapine (/kwɪˈtaɪ.əpiːn/ kwi-TY-ə-peen), sold under the brand name Seroquel among others, is a medication of the atypical antipsychotic class. It is used in the treatment of schizophrenia, bipolar disorder, and major depressive disorder. Quetiapine is also widely prescribed off-label as a sleep aid for its tranquillizing effects. Some have raised concerns that the undesirable side effects from off-label use may outweigh its benefits, though this remains an active area of research. It is taken orally.

Common side effects include sedation, fatigue, weight gain, constipation, and dry mouth. Other side effects include low blood pressure with standing, seizures, high blood sugar, tardive dyskinesia, and neuroleptic malignant syndrome. In older people with dementia, its use increases the risk of death. Use in the third trimester of pregnancy may result in a movement disorder in the baby for some time after birth. Quetiapine is believed to work by blocking a number of receptors, including those for serotonin and dopamine.

Quetiapine was developed in 1985 and was approved for medical use in the United States in 1997. It is available as a generic medication. In 2023, it was the most prescribed antipsychotic and 60th most commonly prescribed medication in the United States, with more than 10 million prescriptions. It is on the World Health Organization's List of Essential Medicines.

The drug is typically among two antipsychotics (the other being olanzapine) to have superior efficacy for the treatment of bipolar disorder. Quetiapine is one of only two antipsychotics (the other is cariprazine) that produce equal efficacy as standalone therapies for mixed manic-depressive mood swings as they do in combination with an SSRI antidepressant. However, it is less potent than clozapine, amisulpride, olanzapine, risperidone, and paliperidone in alleviating psychotic symptoms or treating schizophrenia.

== Medical uses ==
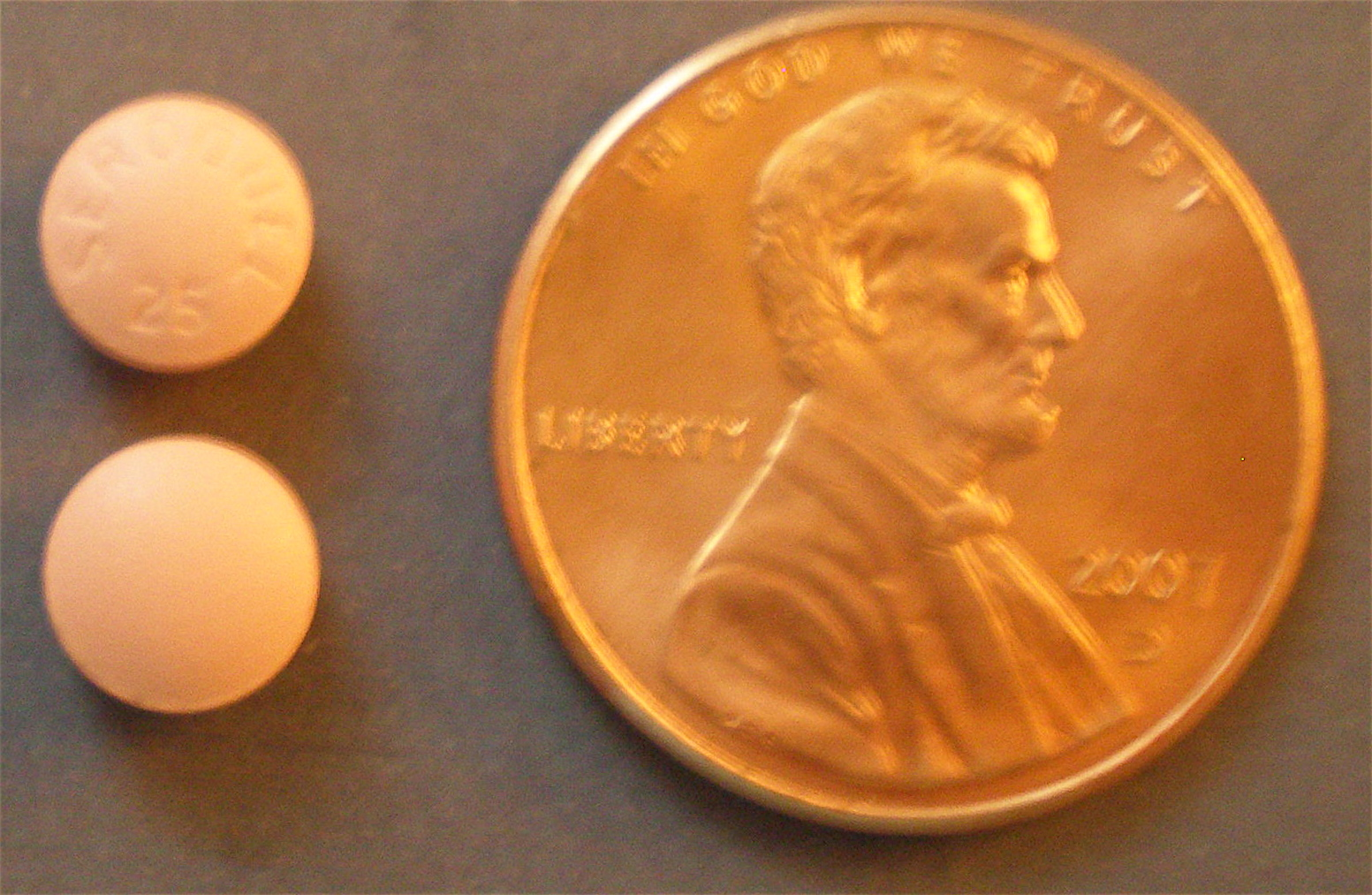
Quetiapine (Seroquel) 25 mg tablets, next to US one-cent coin for comparison

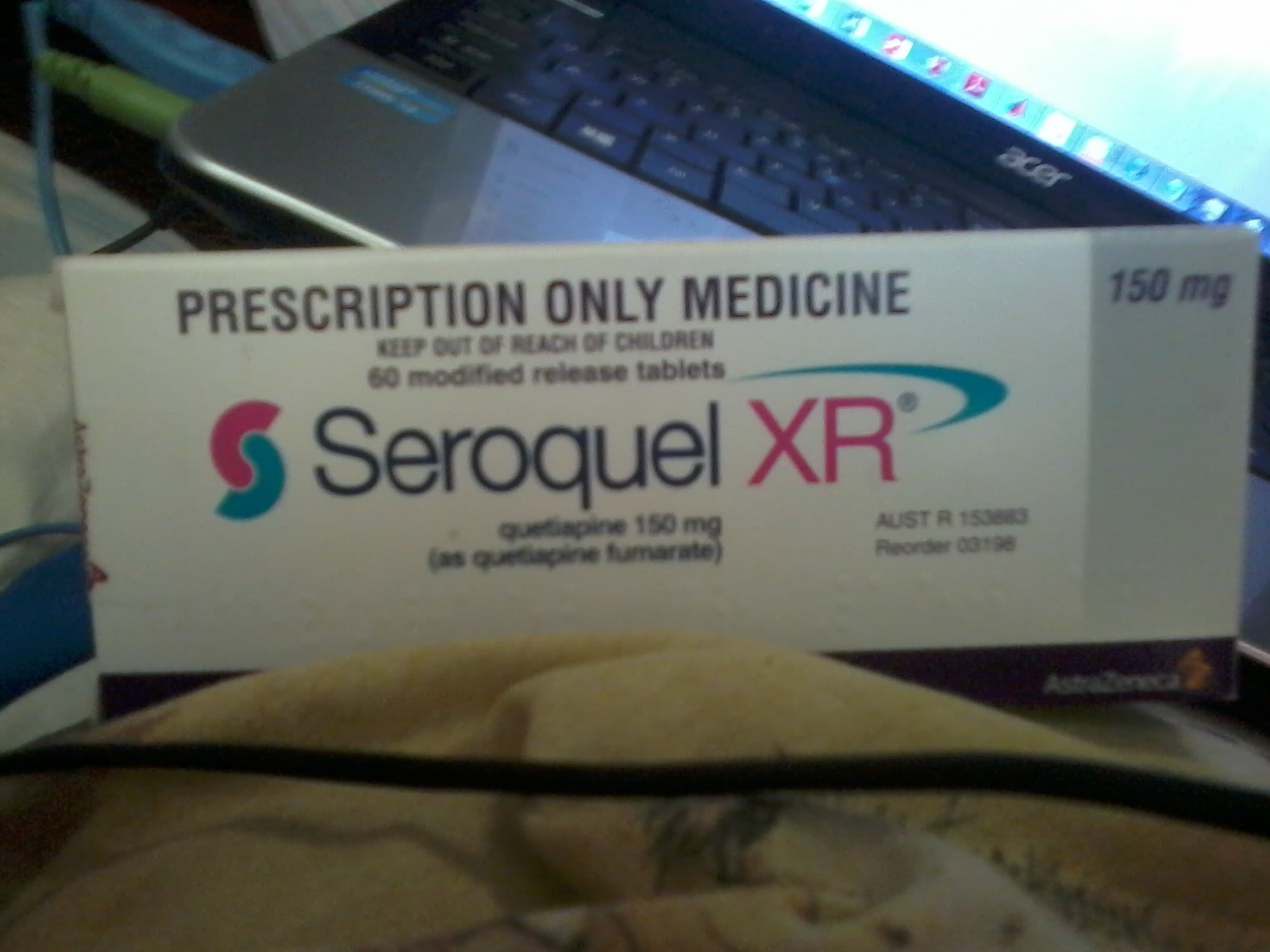
Seroquel XR 150 mg tablet box

Quetiapine is primarily used to treat schizophrenia and bipolar disorder. It targets both positive and negative symptoms of schizophrenia.

=== Schizophrenia ===
A 2013 Cochrane review compared quetiapine to typical antipsychotics:

Quetiapine compared to typical antipsychotics for schizophrenia
Summary
Quetiapine may not differ from typical antipsychotics in the treatment of positive symptoms, general psychopathology, and negative symptoms. However, it causes fewer adverse effects in terms of abnormal ECG, extrapyramidal effects, abnormal prolactin levels and weight gain.

Outcome	Findings in words	Findings in numbers	Quality of evidence
Global state
No clinical significant response	There is no clear difference between people given quetiapine and those receiving typical antipsychotic drugs. These findings are based on data of moderate quality.	RR 0.96 (0.75 to 1.23)	Moderate
Mental state
Average positive symptom score (PANSS)	On average, people receiving quetiapine scored higher (worse) than people treated with typical antipsychotic drugs. There was, however, no clear difference between the groups. This finding is based on data of moderate quality.	MD 0.02 higher (0.39 lower to 0.43 higher)*	Moderate
Average negative symptom score (PANSS)	On average, people receiving quetiapine scored lower (better) than people treated with typical antipsychotic drugs. This finding is based on data of moderate quality.	MD 0.82 lower (1.59 to 0.04 lower)*	Moderate
Cognitive function
Average score	On average, people receiving quetiapine scored higher (better) than people treated with typical antipsychotic drugs. There was no clear difference between the groups. This finding is based on data of very limited quality.	MD 1.55 higher (0.62 lower to 3.72 higher)*	Very low
Leaving the study early
For any reason	Quetiapine is not clearly more acceptable than typical antipsychotic drugs. These findings are based on data of moderate quality.	RR 0.91 (0.81 to 1.01)	Moderate
Adverse effects
Extrapyramidal effects	Quetiapine may reduce the chance of experiencing these movement disorders. This finding is based on data of moderate quality.	RR 0.17 (0.09 to 0.32)	Moderate
Prolactin level Average level (ng/mL)	On average, people receiving quetiapine scored lower (better) than people treated with typical antipsychotic drugs. There was a clear difference between the groups. This finding is based on data of moderate quality.	MD 16.20 lower (23.34 to 9.07 lower)*	Moderate
	*The meaning of these findings for day-to-day care is not clear		

In a 2013 comparison of 15 antipsychotics in effectiveness in treating schizophrenia, quetiapine demonstrated standard effectiveness. It was 13–16% more effective than ziprasidone, chlorpromazine, and asenapine and approximately as effective as haloperidol and aripiprazole.

There is tentative evidence of the benefit of quetiapine versus placebo in schizophrenia; however, definitive conclusions are not possible due to the high rate of attrition in trials (greater than 50%) and the lack of data on economic outcomes, social functioning, or quality of life.

It is debatable whether, as a class, typical or atypical antipsychotics are more effective. Both have equal drop-out and symptom relapse rates when typicals are used at low to moderate dosages. While quetiapine has lower rates of extrapyramidal side effects, there is greater sleepiness and rates of dry mouth.

A Cochrane review comparing quetiapine to other atypical antipsychotic agents tentatively concluded that it may be less efficacious than olanzapine and risperidone; produce fewer movement related side effects than paliperidone, aripiprazole, ziprasidone, risperidone and olanzapine; and produce weight gain similar to risperidone, clozapine and aripiprazole. It found that quetiapine produces suicide attempts; death; QTc prolongation, low blood pressure; tachycardia; sedation; gynaecomastia; galactorrhoea, menstrual irregularity, and decline in white blood cell count at a rate similar to first-generation antipsychotics.

=== Bipolar disorder ===
In those with bipolar disorder, quetiapine is used to treat depressive episodes; acute manic episodes associated with bipolar I disorder (as either monotherapy or adjunct therapy to lithium; valproate or lamotrigine); acute mixed episodes; and maintenance treatment of bipolar I disorder (as adjunct therapy to lithium or divalproex).

=== Major depressive disorder ===
Quetiapine is effective when used by itself and when used along with other medications in major depressive disorder (MDD), but sedation is often an undesirable side effect.

In the United States, the United Kingdom and Australia (while not subsidised by the Australian Pharmaceutical Benefits Scheme for treatment of MDD), quetiapine is licensed for use as an add-on treatment in MDD.

=== Alzheimer's disease ===
Quetiapine does not decrease agitation among people with Alzheimer's disease. Quetiapine worsens intellectual functioning in the elderly with dementia and therefore is not recommended.

=== Insomnia ===
Low doses of quetiapine are commonly prescribed for insomnia. Use for insomnia can present side effects and is an area of concern regarding its off-label use. A 2022 network meta-analysis of 154 double-blind, randomized controlled trials of drug therapies vs. placebo for insomnia in adults found that quetiapine did not demonstrate any short-term benefits in sleep quality. Quetiapine, specifically, had an effect size (standardized mean difference) against placebo for treatment of insomnia of 0.05 (95% CI –1.21 to 1.11) at 4 weeks of treatment, with the certainty of evidence rated as very low. Doses of quetiapine used for insomnia have ranged from 12.5 to 800 mg, with low doses of 25 to 200 mg being the most typical. Regardless of the dose used, some of the more serious adverse effects may still possibly occur at the lower dosing ranges, such as dyslipidemia and neutropenia. Increases in serum triglycerides, LDL-C, and fasting blood glucose have been observed following quetiapine treatment at doses typically used off-label in the treatment of insomnia. These safety concerns at low doses are corroborated by Danish observational studies that showed use of specifically low-dose quetiapine (prescriptions filled for tablet strengths >50 mg were excluded) was associated with an increased risk of major cardiovascular events as compared to use of Z-drugs, with most of the risk being driven by cardiovascular death. Laboratory data from an unpublished analysis of the same cohort also support the lack of dose-dependency of metabolic side effects, as new use of low-dose quetiapine was associated with a risk of increased fasting triglycerides at 1-year follow-up.

=== Others ===
It is sometimes used off-label, often as an augmentation agent, to treat conditions such as Tourette syndrome, musical hallucinations and anxiety disorders.

Quetiapine and clozapine are the most widely used medications for the treatment of Parkinson's disease psychosis due to their relatively low extrapyramidal side-effect liability. Owing to the risks associated with clozapine (e.g. agranulocytosis, diabetes mellitus, etc.), clinicians often attempt treatment with quetiapine first, although the evidence to support quetiapine's use for this indication is significantly weaker than that of clozapine.

== Adverse effects ==
Sources for incidence lists:

Very common (>10% incidence) adverse effects

- Dry mouth
- Dizziness
- Headache
- Somnolence (drowsiness; of 15 antipsychotics quetiapine causes the 5th most sedation. Extended release (XR) formulations tend to produce less sedation, dose-by-dose, than the immediate release formulations.)

Common (1–10% incidence) adverse effects

- High blood pressure
- Orthostatic hypotension
- High pulse rate
- High blood cholesterol
- Elevated serum triglycerides
- Abdominal pain
- Constipation
- Increased appetite
- Vomiting
- Increased liver enzymes
- Backache
- Asthenia
- Insomnia
- Lethargy
- Tremor
- Agitation
- Nasal congestion
- Pharyngitis
- Fatigue
- Pain
- Dyspepsia (Indigestion)
- Peripheral oedema
- Dysphagia
- Extrapyramidal disease: Quetiapine and clozapine are noted for their relative lack of extrapyramidal side effects.
- Weight gain: SMD 0.43 kg when compared to placebo. Produces roughly as much weight gain as risperidone, less weight gain than clozapine, olanzapine and zotepine and more weight gain than ziprasidone, lurasidone, aripiprazole and asenapine. As with many other atypical antipsychotics, this action is likely due to its actions at the H_{1} histamine receptor and 5-HT_{2C} receptor.

Rare (<1% incidence) adverse effects

- Prolonged QT interval (had an odds ratio for prolonging the QT interval over placebo of 0.17)
- Sudden cardiac death
- Syncope
- Diabetic ketoacidosis
- Restless legs syndrome
- Hyponatraemia, low blood sodium.
- Jaundice, yellowing of the eyes, skin and mucous membranes due to an impaired ability of the body to clear bilirubin, a by product of haem breakdown.
- Pancreatitis, pancreas swelling.
- Agranulocytosis, a potentially fatal drop in white blood cell count.
- Leukopenia, a drop in white blood cell count, not as severe as agranulocytosis.
- Neutropenia, a drop in neutrophils, the cell of the immune cells that defends the body against bacterial infections.
- Eosinophilia
- Anaphylaxis, a potentially fatal allergic reaction.
- Seizure
- Hypothyroidism, underactive thyroid gland. Common among bipolar patients; quetiapine increases incidence.
- Myocarditis, swelling of the myocardium.
- Cardiomyopathy
- Hepatitis, swelling of the liver.
- Suicidal ideation
- Priapism. A prolonged and painful erection.
- Stevens–Johnson syndrome. A potentially fatal skin reaction.
- Neuroleptic malignant syndrome a rare and potentially fatal complication of antipsychotic drug treatment. It is characterised by the following symptoms: tremor, rigidity, hyperthermia, tachycardia, mental status changes (e.g. confusion), etc.
- Tardive dyskinesia. A rare and often irreversible neurological condition characterised by involuntary movements of the face, tongue, lips and rest of the body. Most commonly occurs after prolonged treatment with antipsychotics. It is believed to be particularly uncommon with atypical antipsychotics, especially quetiapine and clozapine

Both typical and atypical antipsychotics can cause tardive dyskinesia. According to one study, rates are lower with the atypicals at 3.9% as opposed to the typicals at 5.5%. Although quetiapine and clozapine are atypical antipsychotics, switching to these atypicals is an option to minimize symptoms of tardive dyskinesia caused by other atypicals.

Weight gain can be a problem for some, with quetiapine causing more weight gain than fluphenazine, haloperidol, loxapine, molindone, olanzapine, pimozide, risperidone, thioridazine, thiothixene, trifluoperazine, and ziprasidone, but less than chlorpromazine, clozapine, perphenazine, and sertindole.

As with some other anti-psychotics, quetiapine may lower the seizure threshold, and should be taken with caution in combination with drugs such as bupropion.

=== Discontinuation ===
The British National Formulary recommends a gradual withdrawal when discontinuing antipsychotics to avoid acute withdrawal syndrome or rapid relapse. Symptoms of withdrawal commonly include nausea, vomiting, and loss of appetite. Other symptoms may include restlessness, increased sweating, and trouble sleeping. Less commonly there may be a feeling of the world spinning, numbness, or muscle pains. Symptoms generally resolve after a short period of time.

There is tentative evidence that discontinuation of antipsychotics can result in psychosis. It may also result in reoccurrence of the condition that is being treated. Rarely tardive dyskinesia can occur when the medication is stopped.

=== Pregnancy and lactation ===
Placental exposure is least for quetiapine compared to other atypical antipsychotics. The evidence is insufficient to rule out any risk to the foetus but available data suggests it is unlikely to result in any major foetal malformations. It is secreted in breast milk and hence quetiapine-treated mothers are advised not to breastfeed.

=== Abuse potential ===
In contrast to most other antipsychotic drugs, which tend to be somewhat aversive and often show problems with patient compliance with prescribed medication regimes, quetiapine is sometimes associated with drug misuse and abuse potential, for its hypnotic and sedative effects. It has a limited potential for misuse, usually only in individuals with a history of polysubstance abuse and/or mental illness, and especially in those incarcerated in prisons or secure psychiatric facilities where access to alternative intoxicants is more limited. To a significantly greater extent than other atypical antipsychotic drugs, quetiapine was found to be associated with drug-seeking behaviors, and to have standardised street prices and slang terms associated with it, either by itself or in combination with other drugs (such as "Q-ball" for the intravenous injection of quetiapine mixed with cocaine). The pharmacological basis for this distinction from other second generation antipsychotic drugs is unclear, though it has been suggested that quetiapine's comparatively lower dopamine receptor affinity and strong antihistamine activity might mean it could be regarded as more similar to sedating antihistamines in this context. While these issues have not been regarded as sufficient cause for placing quetiapine under increased legal controls, prescribers have been urged to show caution when prescribing quetiapine to individuals with characteristics that might place them at increased risk for drug misuse.

== Overdose ==
Most instances of acute overdosage result in only sedation, hypotension and tachycardia, but cardiac arrhythmia, coma and death have occurred in adults. Serum or plasma quetiapine concentrations are usually in the 1–10 mg/L range in overdose survivors, while postmortem blood levels of 10–25 mg/L are generally observed in fatal cases. Non-toxic levels in postmortem blood extend to around 0.8 mg/kg, but toxic levels in postmortem blood can begin at 0.35 mg/kg.

== Pharmacology ==
=== Pharmacodynamics ===
Quetiapine (and metabolite)
Site	QTP	NQTP	Action	Ref
SERT	>10,000	927	Blocker	
NET	>10,000	58	Blocker	
DAT	>10,000	>10,000	ND	
5-HT_{1A}	320–432	45	Partial agonist	
5-HT_{1B}	1,109–2,050	1,117	ND	
5-HT_{1D}	>10,000	249	ND	
5-HT_{1E}	1,250–2,402	97	ND	
5-HT_{1F}	2,240	ND	ND	
5-HT_{2A}	96–101	48	Antagonist	
5-HT_{2B}	ND	14	Antagonist	
5-HT_{2C}	2,502	107	Antagonist	
5-HT_{3}	>10,000	394	Antagonist	
5-HT_{4}	ND	ND	ND	ND
5-HT_{5A}	3,120	768	ND	
5-HT_{6}	1,865	503	Antagonist	
5-HT_{7}	307	76	Antagonist	
α_{1A}	22	144	Antagonist	
α_{1B}	39	95	Antagonist	
α_{2A}	2,230–3,630	237	Antagonist	
α_{2B}	90–747	378	Antagonist	
α_{2C}	28.7–350	736	Antagonist	
β_{1}	>10,000	>10,000	ND	
β_{2}	>10,000	>10,000	ND	
D_{1}	712	214	Antagonist	
D_{2}	245	196	Antagonist	
D_{2L}	700	ND	Antagonist	
D_{2S}	390	ND	Antagonist	
D_{3}	340–483	567	Antagonist	
D_{4}	1,202	1,297	Antagonist	
D_{4.2}	1,600	ND	Antagonist	
D_{5}	1,738	1,419	Antagonist	
H_{1}	2.2–11	3.5	Antagonist	
H_{2}	>10,000	298	Antagonist	
H_{3}	>10,000	>10,000	ND	
H_{4}	>10,000	1,660	ND	
M_{1}	858	39	Antagonist	
M_{2}	1,339	453	ND	
M_{3}	>10,000	23	Antagonist	
M_{4}	542	110	ND	
M_{5}	1,942	23	Antagonist	
σ_{1}	220–3,651	>10,000	ND	
σ_{2}	1,344	1,050	ND	
NMDA (PCP)	>10,000	ND	Antagonist	
VDCC	>10,000	ND	ND	
hERG	ND	>10,000 (IC_{50})	ND	
Values are K_{i} (nM), unless otherwise noted. The smaller the value, the more strongly the drug binds to the site. All data are for human cloned proteins, except σ_{1} (guinea pig), σ_{2} (rat), and VDCC (rat).

Quetiapine has the following pharmacological actions:

- Dopamine D_{1}, D_{2}, D_{3}, D_{4}, and D_{5} receptor antagonist
- Serotonin 5-HT_{1A} receptor partial agonist, 5-HT_{2A}, 5-HT_{2B}, 5-HT_{2C}, 5-HT_{3}, 5-HT_{6}, and 5-HT_{7} receptor antagonist, and 5-HT_{1B}, 5-HT_{1D}, 5-HT_{1E}, and 5-HT_{1F} receptor ligand
- α_{1}- and α_{2}-adrenergic receptor antagonist
- Histamine H_{1} receptor antagonist
- Muscarinic acetylcholine receptor antagonist

This means quetiapine is a dopamine, serotonin, and adrenergic antagonist, and a potent antihistamine with some anticholinergic properties. Quetiapine binds strongly to serotonin receptors; the drug acts as a partial agonist at 5-HT_{1A} receptors and as an antagonist to all other serotonin receptors it has affinity for. Serial PET scans evaluating the D_{2} receptor occupancy of quetiapine have demonstrated that quetiapine very rapidly disassociates from the D_{2} receptor. Theoretically, this allows for normal physiological surges of dopamine to elicit normal effects in areas such as the nigrostriatal and tuberoinfundibular pathways, thus minimizing the risk of side-effects such as pseudo-parkinsonism as well as elevations in prolactin. Some of the antagonized receptors (serotonin, norepinephrine) are actually autoreceptors whose blockade tends to increase the release of neurotransmitters.

At very low doses, quetiapine acts primarily as a histamine receptor blocker (antihistamine) and α_{1}-adrenergic blocker. When the dose is increased, quetiapine activates the adrenergic system and binds strongly to serotonin receptors and autoreceptors. At high doses, quetiapine starts blocking significant amounts of dopamine receptors. Due to the drug's sedating H_{1} activity, it is often prescribed at low doses for insomnia. While some feel that low doses of drugs with antihistamine effects like quetiapine and mirtazapine are safer than drugs associated with physical dependency or other risk factors, concern has been raised by some professionals that off-label prescribing has become too widespread due to underappreciated hazards.

When treating schizophrenia, antagonism of D_{2} receptor by quetiapine in the mesolimbic pathway relieves positive symptoms and antagonism of the 5-HT_{2A} receptor in the frontal cortex of the brain may relieve negative symptoms and reduce severity of psychotic episodes. Quetiapine has fewer extrapyramidal side effects and is less likely to cause hyperprolactinemia when compared to other drugs used to treat schizophrenia, so is used as a first line treatment.

Since the noradrenaline transporter is responsible for most of the dopamine clearance in the prefrontal cortex, norquetiapine blocks reuptake of dopamine too, accumulating the dopamine in the synapse.

=== Pharmacokinetics ===
Peak levels of quetiapine occur 1.5 hours after a dose. The plasma protein binding of quetiapine is 83%. The major active metabolite of quetiapine is norquetiapine (N-desalkylquetiapine). Quetiapine has an elimination half-life of 6 or 7 hours. Its metabolite, norquetiapine, has a half-life of 9 to 12 hours. Quetiapine is excreted primarily via the kidneys (73%) and in feces (20%) after hepatic metabolism, the remainder (1%) is excreted as the drug in its unmetabolized form.

Skeletal formula of norquetiapine

== Chemistry ==
Quetiapine is a tetracyclic compound and is closely related structurally to clozapine, olanzapine, loxapine, and other tetracyclic antipsychotics.

=== Synthesis ===
The synthesis of quetiapine begins with a dibenzothiazepinone. The lactam is first treated with phosphoryl chloride to produce a dibenzothiazepine. A nucleophilic substitution is used to introduce the sidechain.

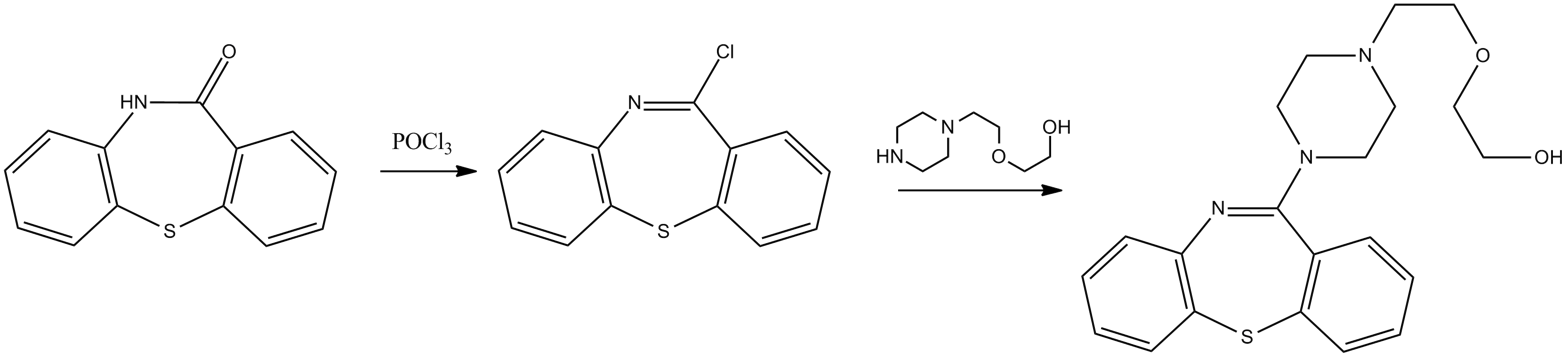

== History ==
=== Sustained-release ===
AstraZeneca submitted a new drug application for a sustained-release version of quetiapine in the United States, Canada, and the European Union in the second half of 2006 for treatment of schizophrenia.

In May 2007, the United States FDA approved Seroquel XR for acute treatment of schizophrenia. During its 2007 Q2 earnings conference, AstraZeneca announced plans to launch Seroquel XR in the United States in August 2007. However, Seroquel XR has become available in American pharmacies only after the FDA approved Seroquel XR for use as maintenance treatment for schizophrenia, in addition to acute treatment of the illness, on 16 November 2007. The company has not provided a reason for the delay of Seroquel XR's launch.

Health Canada approved sale of Seroquel XR on 27 September 2007.

In October 2008, the FDA approved Seroquel XR for the treatment of bipolar disorder, including its associated depression and manic episodes.

In December 2008, Biovail announced that the FDA had accepted the company's ANDA to market its own version of sustained-release quetiapine. Biovail's sustained-release tablets will compete with AstraZeneca's Seroquel XR.

In December 2008, AstraZeneca notified shareholders that the FDA had asked for additional information on the company's application to expand the use of sustained-release quetiapine for treatment of depression.

== Society and culture ==
=== Regulatory status ===
In the United States, the Food and Drug Administration (FDA) has approved quetiapine for the treatment of schizophrenia and of acute manic episodes associated with bipolar disorder (bipolar mania) and for treatment of bipolar depression. In 2009, quetiapine XR was approved as adjunctive treatment of major depressive disorder.

Quetiapine received its initial approval from the US FDA for the treatment of schizophrenia in 1997. In 2004, it received its second indication for the treatment of mania-associated bipolar disorder. In 2007 and 2008, studies were conducted on quetiapine's efficacy in treating generalized anxiety disorder and major depression.

Patent protection for the product ended in 2012; however, in a number of regions, the long-acting version remained under patent until 2017.

=== Lawsuits ===
In April 2010, the United States Department of Justice fined AstraZeneca $520 million for the company's aggressive marketing of Seroquel for off-label uses. According to the Department of Justice, "the company recruited doctors to serve as authors of articles that were ghostwritten by medical literature companies and about studies the doctors in question did not conduct. AstraZeneca then used those studies and articles as the basis for promotional messages about unapproved uses of Seroquel."

Multiple lawsuits have been filed in relation to quetiapine's side-effects, in particular, diabetes.

Approximately 10,000 lawsuits have been filed against AstraZeneca, alleging that quetiapine caused problems ranging from slurred speech and chronic insomnia to deaths.

=== Controversy ===
In 2004, a young man named Dan Markingson committed suicide in a controversial Seroquel clinical trial at the University of Minnesota while under an involuntary commitment order. A group of University of Minnesota bioethicists charged that the trial involved an alarming number of ethical violations.

=== Nurofen Plus tampering case ===
In August 2011, the United Kingdom's Medicines and Healthcare products Regulatory Agency (MHRA) issued a class-4 drug alert following reports that some batches of Nurofen Plus contained Seroquel XL tablets instead.

Following the issue of the Class-4 Drug Alert, Reckitt Benckiser (UK) Ltd received further reports of rogue blister strips in cartons of two additional batches of Nurofen Plus tablets. One of the new batches contained Seroquel XL 50 mg tablets and one contained the Pfizer product Neurontin 100 mg capsules.

Following discussions with the MHRA's Defective Medicines Report Centre (DMRC), Reckitt Benckiser (UK) Ltd decided to recall all remaining unexpired stock of Nurofen Plus tablets in any pack size, leading to a Class-1 Drug Alert. The contamination was later traced to in-store tampering by a customer.
