= Indanidine =

Names
- Preferred IUPAC name N-(4,5-Dihydro-1H-imidazol-2-yl)-2-methyl-2H-indazol-4-amine
- Other names N-(4,5-Dihydro-1H-imidazol-2-yl)-2-methylindazol-4-amine

Identifiers
CAS Number	85392-79-6
3D model (JSmol)	Interactive image
ChEBI	CHEBI:345108
ChEMBL	ChEMBL358373
ChemSpider	108770
IUPHAR/BPS	512
MeSH	Indanidine
PubChem CID	121925
UNII	MP564IFE34
CompTox Dashboard (EPA)	DTXSID60234602
- InChI: InChI=1S/C11H13N5/c1-16-7-8-9(3-2-4-10(8)15-16)14-11-12-5-6-13-11/h2-4,7H,5-6H2,1H3,(H2,12,13,14) Key: PNHJTLDBYZVCGW-UHFFFAOYSA-N
- SMILES: CN1C=C2C(C=CC=C2NC2=NCCN2)=N1

Properties
Chemical formula	C_{11}H_{13}N_{5}
Molar mass	215.260 g·mol^{−1}
- Except where otherwise noted, data are given for materials in their standard state (at 25 °C [77 °F], 100 kPa). Infobox references

Indanidine is an alpha-adrenergic agonist.
