= Detomidine =

Chemical compound

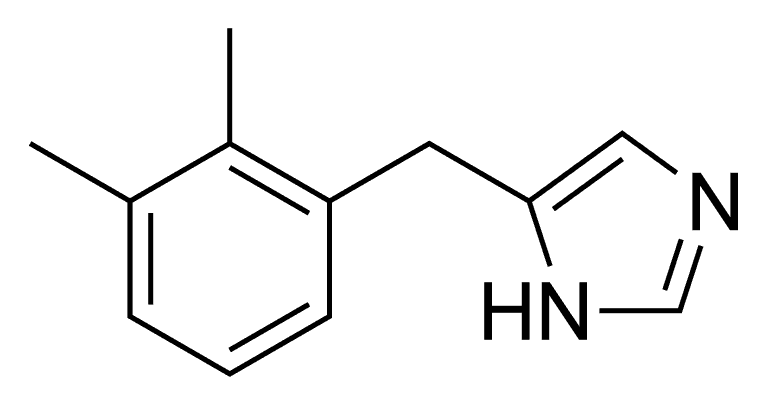

Clinical data
- AHFS/Drugs.com: International Drug Names
- ATCvet code: QN05CM90 (WHO)

Legal status
- Legal status: Veterinary use only

Pharmacokinetic data
- Elimination half-life: 30 min

Identifiers
- IUPAC name: 4-[(2,3-dimethylphenyl)methyl]-3H-imidazole
- CAS Number: 76631-46-4
- PubChem CID: 56032
- ChemSpider: 50586
- UNII: 7N8K34P2XH
- KEGG: D07795
- ChEMBL: ChEMBL2110829
- CompTox Dashboard (EPA): DTXSID00227457

Chemical and physical data
- Formula: C_{12}H_{14}N_{2}
- Molar mass: 186.258 g·mol^{−1}
- 3D model (JSmol): Interactive image
- SMILES: Cc2cccc(Cc1cnc[nH]1)c2C
- InChI: InChI=1S/C12H14N2/c1-9-4-3-5-11(10(9)2)6-12-7-13-8-14-12/h3-5,7-8H,6H2,1-2H3,(H,13,14); Key:RHDJRPPFURBGLQ-UHFFFAOYSA-N

Detomidine is an imidazole derivative and α_{2}-adrenergic receptor agonist, used as a large animal sedative, primarily used in horses. It is usually available as the salt detomidine hydrochloride. It is a prescription medication available to veterinarians sold under various trade names.

== Use ==
Currently, detomidine is licensed for use only in non-meat horses in the United States, but it is also licensed for use in cattle in Europe and Australia. Detomidine's withholding period is 12–72 hours for dairy cattle and 2–3 days for meat cattle.

== Properties ==
Detomidine is a sedative with analgesic properties. α_{2}-adrenergic receptor agonists produce dose-dependent sedative and analgesic effects, mediated by activation of α_{2} catecholamine receptors, thus inducing a negative feedback response, reducing production of excitatory neurotransmitters. Due to inhibition of the sympathetic nervous system, detomidine also has cardiac and respiratory effects and an antidiuretic action.

== Pharmacology ==
Detomidine is an α_{2}-adrenergic receptor agonist that binds at a ratio of 260:1 with imidazoline receptor activity.

== Veterinary use ==
Detomidine is administered intramuscularly. Oral transmucosal has been investigated and is used in some countries although it has poor bioavailability of around 20–25%. Intravaginal administration in the horse and alpaca has induced sedation.

Detomidine administration in sheep activates pulmonary macrophages that damage the endothelium of capillaries and alveolar type I cells. This in turns causes alveolar haemorrhage and oedema causing hypoxaemia.

== See also ==
- Medetomidine
- Dexmedetomidine
