= Norquetiapine =

Clinical data
- Other names: N-Desalkylquetiapine; NQTP
- Drug class: Atypical antipsychotic
- ATC code: N05AH02 (WHO)

Identifiers
- IUPAC name: 6-piperazin-1-ylbenzo[b][1,4]benzothiazepine
- CAS Number: 5747-48-8
- PubChem CID: 11369918
- IUPHAR/BPS: 7545
- ChemSpider: 9544835
- UNII: V3H1ZVV9S6
- ChEBI: CHEBI:188278
- ChEMBL: ChEMBL3526391
- CompTox Dashboard (EPA): DTXSID30881147
- ECHA InfoCard: 100.118.138

Chemical and physical data
- Formula: C_{17}H_{17}N_{3}S
- Molar mass: 295.40 g·mol^{−1}
- 3D model (JSmol): Interactive image
- Boiling point: 465.2 °C (869.4 °F) ±55.0 °C at 760 mmHg
- SMILES: C1CN(CCN1)C2=NC3=CC=CC=C3SC4=CC=CC=C42
- InChI: InChI=1S/C17H17N3S/c1-3-7-15-13(5-1)17(20-11-9-18-10-12-20)19-14-6-2-4-8-16(14)21-15/h1-8,18H,9-12H2; Key:JLOAJISUHPIQOX-UHFFFAOYSA-N

Norquetiapine, also known as N-desalkylquetiapine, is a 5-HT_{2B} serotonin receptor modulator, and norepinephrine reuptake inhibitor. It is the principal metabolite of quetiapine.
