= Mivazerol =

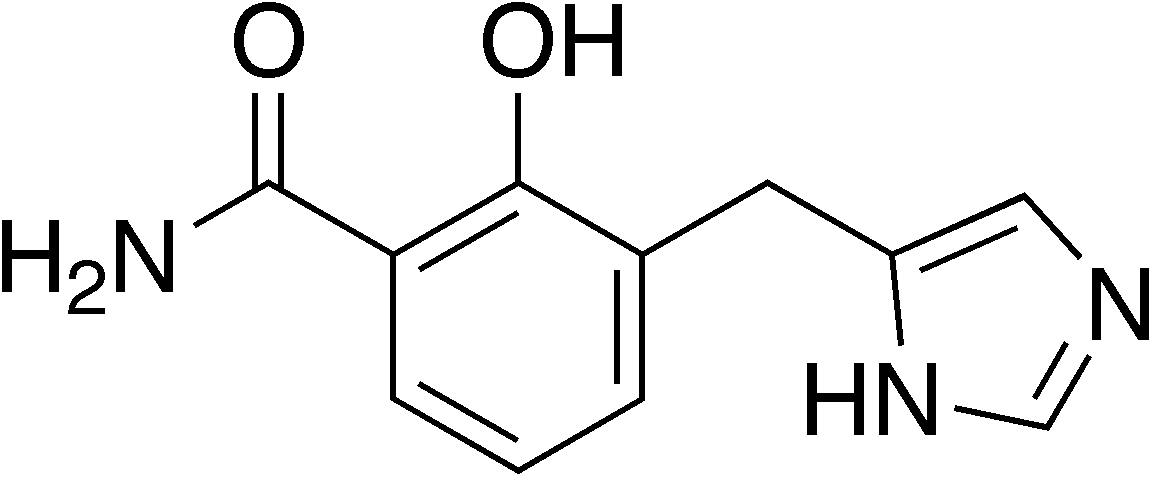

Names
- IUPAC name 2-Hydroxy-3-(3H-imidazol-4-ylmethyl)benzamide

Identifiers
CAS Number	125472-02-8
3D model (JSmol)	Interactive image
ChemSpider	54780
MeSH	Mivazerol
PubChem CID	60784
UNII	W5P1SSA8KD
CompTox Dashboard (EPA)	DTXSID30154782
- InChI: InChI=1S/C11H11N3O2/c12-11(16)9-3-1-2-7(10(9)15)4-8-5-13-6-14-8/h1-3,5-6,15H,4H2,(H2,12,16)(H,13,14) Key: RLHGFJMGWQXPBW-UHFFFAOYSA-N; InChI=1/C11H11N3O2/c12-11(16)9-3-1-2-7(10(9)15)4-8-5-13-6-14-8/h1-3,5-6,15H,4H2,(H2,12,16)(H,13,14) Key: RLHGFJMGWQXPBW-UHFFFAOYAF
- SMILES: O=C(c1c(O)c(ccc1)Cc2cnc[nH]2)N

Properties
Chemical formula	C_{11}H_{11}N_{3}O_{2}
Molar mass	217.22 g/mol
- Except where otherwise noted, data are given for materials in their standard state (at 25 °C [77 °F], 100 kPa). verify (what is ?) Infobox references

Mivazerol is an α_{2}-adrenergic receptor agonist.
