= Guanoxabenz =

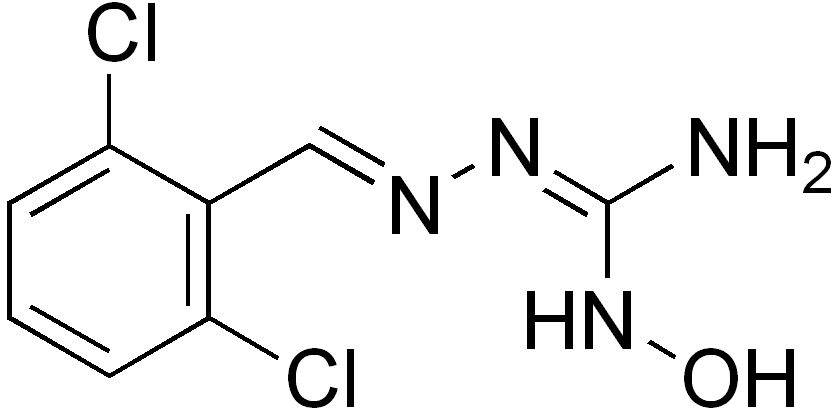

Names
- IUPAC name 2-{[(2,6-dichlorophenyl)methylidene]amino}-1-hydroxyguanidine

Identifiers
CAS Number	24047-25-4
3D model (JSmol)	Interactive image
ChEMBL	ChEMBL461343
ChemSpider	7842543
KEGG	D04398
MeSH	Guanoxabenz
PubChem CID	9567831
UNII	P9HIK5V7WK
CompTox Dashboard (EPA)	DTXSID101027553
- InChI: InChI=1S/C8H8Cl2N4O/c9-6-2-1-3-7(10)5(6)4-12-13-8(11)14-15/h1-4,15H,(H3,11,13,14)/b12-4+ Key: QKIQJNNDIWGVEH-UUILKARUSA-N; InChI=1/C8H8Cl2N4O/c9-6-2-1-3-7(10)5(6)4-12-13-8(11)14-15/h1-4,15H,(H3,11,13,14)/b12-4+ Key: QKIQJNNDIWGVEH-UUILKARUBE
- SMILES: Clc1cccc(Cl)c1\C=N\N=C(/N)NO

Properties
Chemical formula	C_{8}H_{8}Cl_{2}N_{4}O
Molar mass	247.08 g/mol

Pharmacology
ATC code	C02CC07 (WHO)
- Except where otherwise noted, data are given for materials in their standard state (at 25 °C [77 °F], 100 kPa). verify (what is ?) Infobox references

Guanoxabenz is a metabolite of guanabenz.
