= Tolazoline =

Chemical compound

Clinical data
- AHFS/Drugs.com: International Drug Names
- Routes of administration: Intravenous
- ATC code: C04AB02 (WHO) M02AX02 (WHO) QV03AB94 (WHO)

Identifiers
- IUPAC name: 2-Benzyl-4,5-dihydro-1H-imidazole
- CAS Number: 59-98-3
- PubChem CID: 5504
- IUPHAR/BPS: 7310
- DrugBank: DB00797
- ChemSpider: 5303
- UNII: CHH9H12AQ3
- KEGG: D08614
- ChEBI: CHEBI:28502
- ChEMBL: ChEMBL770
- CompTox Dashboard (EPA): DTXSID3023683
- ECHA InfoCard: 100.000.408

Chemical and physical data
- Formula: C_{10}H_{12}N_{2}
- Molar mass: 160.220 g·mol^{−1}
- 3D model (JSmol): Interactive image
- SMILES: N\1=C(\NCC/1)Cc2ccccc2
- InChI: InChI=1S/C10H12N2/c1-2-4-9(5-3-1)8-10-11-6-7-12-10/h1-5H,6-8H2,(H,11,12); Key:JIVZKJJQOZQXQB-UHFFFAOYSA-N

Tolazoline is a non-selective competitive α_{2}-adrenergic receptor antagonist. It is a vasodilator that is used to treat spasms of peripheral blood vessels (as in acrocyanosis). It has also been used (in conjunction with sodium nitroprusside) successfully as an antidote to reverse the severe peripheral vasoconstriction which can occur as a result of overdose with certain 5-HT_{2A} receptor agonist drugs such as 25I-NBOMe, DOB, and Bromodragonfly.

== History ==
Tolazoline was first used in the 1980s as an alternative reversal agent for xylazine.

== Use ==
Tolazoline is used in large animal medicine to reverse the effects of α_{2}-adrenergic receptor agonists, typically xylazine. Large doses of intravenous tolazoline in cattle can cause hyperesthesia and opisthotonos and other routes such as intramusucular are preferred.

== Pharmacology ==
Tolazoline binds to the a_{2} adrenergic receptor at a ratio of 4:1, the lowest of all a_{2} adrenergic receptor antagonists. Tolazoline activates the imidazoline receptor.

IV tolazoline has slow elimination and a large distribution in the horse.
