= Romifidine =

Chemical compound

Clinical data
- AHFS/Drugs.com: International Drug Names
- Routes of administration: IV
- ATCvet code: QN05CM93 (WHO)

Legal status
- Legal status: Veterinary use only

Identifiers
- IUPAC name: N-(2-bromo-6-fluorophenyl)-4,5-dihydro-1H-imidazol-2-amine
- CAS Number: 65896-16-4
- PubChem CID: 71969
- ChemSpider: 64975
- UNII: 876351L05K
- CompTox Dashboard (EPA): DTXSID40216103
- ECHA InfoCard: 100.158.065

Chemical and physical data
- Formula: C_{9}H_{9}BrFN_{3}
- Molar mass: 258.094 g·mol^{−1}
- 3D model (JSmol): Interactive image
- SMILES: C1CN=C(N1)NC2=C(C=CC=C2Br)F
- InChI: InChI=1S/C9H9BrFN3/c10-6-2-1-3-7(11)8(6)14-9-12-4-5-13-9/h1-3H,4-5H2,(H2,12,13,14); Key:KDPNLRQZHDJRFU-UHFFFAOYSA-N

Romifidine is a drug that is used in veterinary medicine as a sedative mainly in large animals such as horses, although it may be used in a wide variety of species. It is not used in humans, but is closely related in structure to the commonly used drug clonidine.

Romifidine acts as an agonist at the α_{2} adrenergic receptor subtype. Side effects can include bradycardia and respiratory depression. It is often used alongside other sedative or analgesic drugs such as ketamine or butorphanol. Yohimbine can be used as an antidote to rapidly reverse the effects.

== Use ==
Romifidine is licensed for cats and dogs in several countries. Romifidine is licensed for non-meat horses. Romifidine may produce less ataxia during standing sedation than other α_{2}-adrenergic receptor agonists.

== Pharmacology ==
Romifidine is an α_{2}-adrenergic receptor agonist that binds at a ratio of 340:1 over the imidazoline receptor.

== Side effects ==
Romifidine administration in sheep activates pulmonary macrophages that damage the endothelium of capillaries and alveolar type I cells. This in turns causes alveolar haemorrhage and oedema causing hypoxaemia.
