= Medetomidine =

Chemical compound

Clinical data
- Trade names: Domitor, others
- AHFS/Drugs.com: Monograph
- License data: US DailyMed: Medetomidine
- Drug class: Alpha-2 adrenergic receptor agonist
- ATCvet code: QN05CM91 (WHO)

Legal status
- Legal status: CA: ℞-only; US: ℞-only

Identifiers
- IUPAC name: (RS)-4-[1-(2,3-Dimethylphenyl)ethyl]-3H-imidazole
- CAS Number: 86347-14-0
- PubChem CID: 68602
- DrugBank: DB00633
- ChemSpider: 61868
- UNII: MR15E85MQM
- KEGG: D08165; D04883
- ChEBI: CHEBI:48552
- ChEMBL: ChEMBL77921
- CompTox Dashboard (EPA): DTXSID6048258
- ECHA InfoCard: 100.242.450

Chemical and physical data
- Formula: C_{13}H_{16}N_{2}
- Molar mass: 200.285 g·mol^{−1}
- 3D model (JSmol): Interactive image
- Chirality: Racemic mixture
- SMILES: n1cc([nH]c1)C(c2c(c(ccc2)C)C)C
- InChI: InChI=1S/C13H16N2/c1-9-5-4-6-12(10(9)2)11(3)13-7-14-8-15-13/h4-8,11H,1-3H3,(H,14,15); Key:CUHVIMMYOGQXCV-UHFFFAOYSA-N

Medetomidine is a veterinary anesthetic medication with potent sedative effects. As of December 2025, it is an emerging illicit drug adulterant.

It is a racemic mixture of two stereoisomers, levomedetomidine and dexmedetomidine, the latter being the isomer with the pharmacologic effect as an alpha 2- adrenergic agonist. Effects can be reversed using atipamezole.

It was developed by Orion Pharma. It is approved for dogs in the United States, and distributed in the United States by Pfizer Animal Health and by Novartis Animal Health in Canada under the product name Domitor. Starting in 2022 medetomidine has been detected in the US in samples of illicit drugs and associated with overdoses.

The free base form of medetomidine is sold as an antifouling substance for marine paints.

== History ==
Medetomidine was developed in 1987 for use as a sedative in veterinary medicine in Europe. In 1996 medetomidine received FDA approval for use in dogs.

== Pharmacology ==
Medetomidine is a racemic mixture of two optical or stereoisomers, levomedetomidine and dexmedetomidine. The latter causes the alpha 2- adrenergic agonist effects.

Medetomidine is an α_{2}-adrenergic receptor agonist that binds at a ratio of 1620:1 with imidazoline receptor activity.

Medetomidine is metabolised in the liver via hydroxylation.

== Veterinary use ==
Medetomidine has supplanted xylazine as a sedative for cats and dogs in several countries. Medetomidine is used off-label in horses. Medetomidine is highly selective for the α_{2}-adrenergic receptor, being over 10 times more selective for α_{2} versus α_{1} than xylazine. Medetomidine lasts for half an hour to three hours, with higher doses having a longer effect. Medetomidine is used for short procedures and is often combined with ketamine or an opioid such as butorphanol.

Atipamezole, an a_{2} adrenergic antagonist, was developed specifically as a reversal agent for medetomidine.

=== Side effects ===
Following administration, marked peripheral vasoconstriction and bradycardia are noted.

Medetomidine administration in sheep activates pulmonary macrophages that damage the capillary endothelium and alveolar type I cells. This in turns causes alveolar haemorrhage and oedema causing hypoxaemia.

== Use in marine paint ==
The free base form of medetomidine is sold as Selektope as an antifouling substance in marine paints. It is mainly effective against barnacles, as shown in vitro with Balanus improvisus. It has also shown effect on other hard fouling like tube worms. When the barnacle cyprid larva encounters a surface containing medetomidine the molecule interacts with the octopamine receptor in the larva. This causes the settling larva to increase its kicking to more than 100 kicks per minute, which makes becoming sessile nearly impossible. When the larva swims away from the surface, the effect disappears (reversible effect). The larva regains its pre-exposure function and can settle somewhere else.

== Illicit use in humans ==
=== Component of street drugs ===
Medetomidine has been found as a component in street drug mixtures in the US starting in 2022, containing synthetic opioids in a similar manner as xylazine-fentanyl, such mixtures have been nicknamed "tranq" (short for tranquilizer); medetomidine on its own has been nicknamed "rhino tranq". The combination of α2 adrenergic agonists with opioids are believed to greatly increase the sedative effects of each drug, which some drug users may perceive as a better or more potent product. The Center for Forensic Science Research and Education (CFSRE) first identified a synthetic opioid blend containing fentanyl and medetomidine sold in Maryland in July, 2022. Additional detections in late 2023 and early 2024 found similar medetomidine mixtures in Missouri, Colorado, Pennsylvania, California, Maryland, and New York found in both drug material and the blood of patients experiencing overdoses.
