= Dexmedetomidine =

Sedative medication

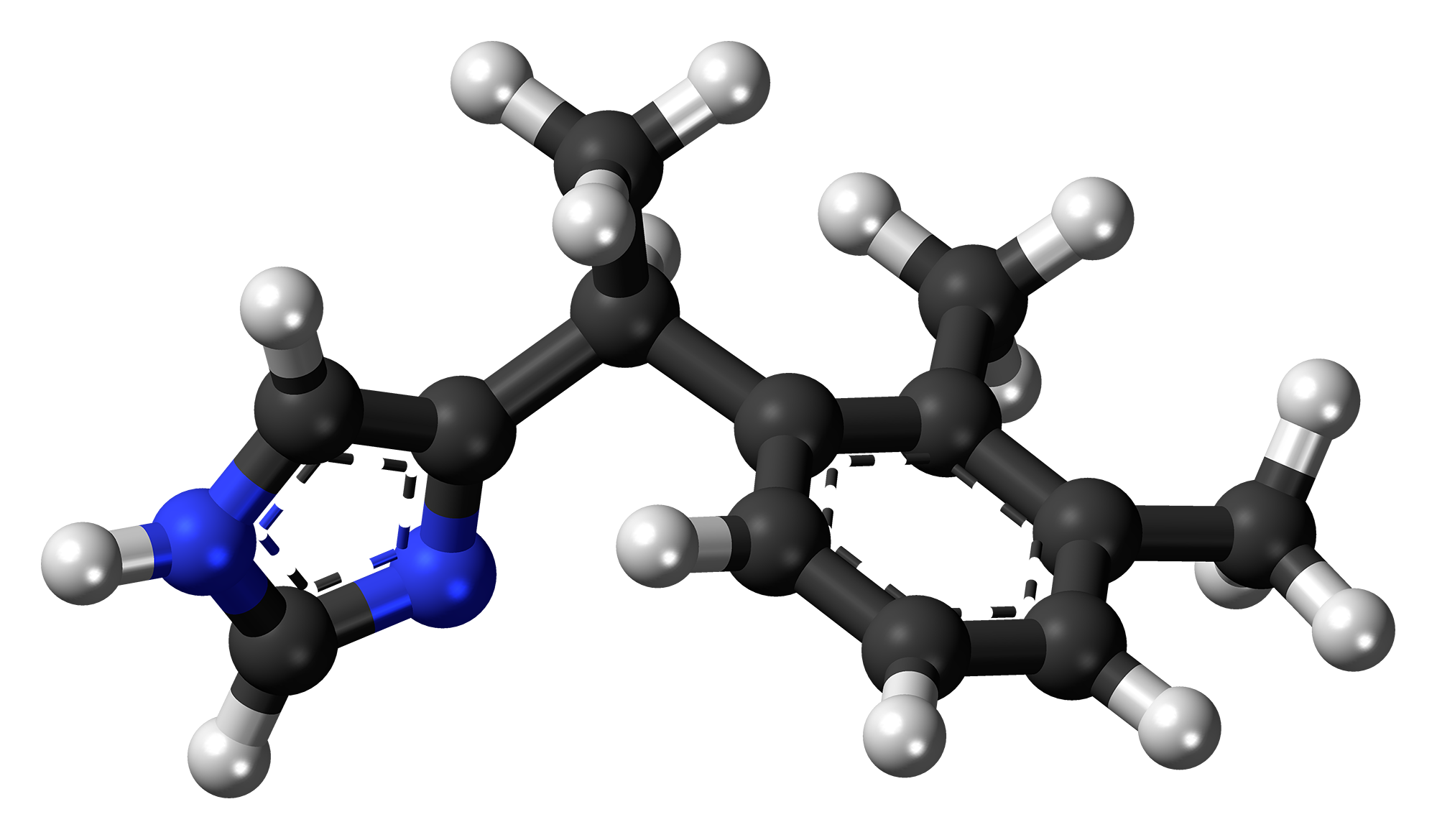
- Above: molecular structure of dexmedetomidine Below: 3D ball and stick representation of a dexmedetomidine molecule

Clinical data
- Trade names: Precedex, Igalmi, Dexdomitor (veterinary), others
- Other names: MPV-1440; MPV1440; BXCL-501; BXCL501
- AHFS/Drugs.com: Monograph
- License data: US DailyMed: Dexmedetomidine
- Pregnancy category: AU: B1
- Routes of administration: Intravenous, sublingual, buccal
- Drug class: α_{2}-Adrenergic receptor agonist; Sedative; Hypnotic; Tranquilizer
- ATC code: N05CM18 (WHO)

Legal status
- Legal status: AU: S4 (Prescription only); BR: Class C1 (Other controlled substances); US: ℞-only; EU: Rx-only; In general: ℞ (Prescription only)

Pharmacokinetic data
- Bioavailability: Oral: 16% Sublingual: 72% Buccal: 82% Transdermal: 88% Intramuscular: 73–104%
- Protein binding: 94% (mostly albumin)
- Metabolism: Near-complete hepatic metabolism to inactive metabolites
- Metabolites: Various
- Elimination half-life: 1.8–3.7 hours
- Excretion: Urine (95%), feces (4%)

Identifiers
- IUPAC name: 5-[(1S)-1-(2,3-dimethylphenyl)ethyl]-1H-imidazole
- CAS Number: 113775-47-6
- PubChem CID: 5311068
- DrugBank: DB00633
- ChemSpider: 4470605
- UNII: 67VB76HONO
- KEGG: D00514; as HCl: D01205
- ChEBI: CHEBI:4466
- ChEMBL: ChEMBL778
- CompTox Dashboard (EPA): DTXSID10873388
- ECHA InfoCard: 100.119.391

Chemical and physical data
- Formula: C_{13}H_{16}N_{2}
- Molar mass: 200.285 g·mol^{−1}
- 3D model (JSmol): Interactive image
- SMILES: CC1=C(C(=CC=C1)[C@H](C)C2=CN=CN2)C
- InChI: InChI=1S/C13H16N2/c1-9-5-4-6-12(10(9)2)11(3)13-7-14-8-15-13/h4-8,11H,1-3H3,(H,14,15)/t11-/m0/s1; Key:CUHVIMMYOGQXCV-NSHDSACASA-N

Dexmedetomidine, sold under the brand name Precedex among others, is a medication used for sedation. Veterinarians use dexmedetomidine for similar purposes in treating cats, dogs, and horses. It is also used in humans to treat acute agitation associated with schizophrenia or bipolar disorder. The drug is administered as an intravenous solution or as a buccal or sublingual film.

Similar to clonidine, dexmedetomidine is a sympatholytic drug that acts as an agonist of α_{2}-adrenergic receptors in certain parts of the brain. It was developed by Orion Pharma.

== Medical uses ==
=== Intensive care unit sedation ===
Studies suggest dexmedetomidine for sedation in mechanically ventilated adults may reduce time to extubation and ICU stay.

Compared with other sedatives, some studies suggest dexmedetomidine may be associated with less delirium. However, this finding is not consistent across multiple studies. At the very least, when aggregating many study results together, use of dexmedetomidine appears to be associated with less neurocognitive dysfunction compared to other sedatives. Whether this observation has a beneficial psychological impact is unclear. From an economic perspective, dexmedetomidine is associated with lower ICU costs, largely due to a shorter time to extubation.

=== Procedural sedation ===
Dexmedetomidine can also be used for procedural sedation such as during colonoscopy. It can be used as an adjunct with other sedatives like benzodiazepines, opioids, and propofol to enhance sedation and help maintain hemodynamic stability by decreasing the requirement of other sedatives. Dexmedetomidine is also used for procedural sedation in children.

It can be used for sedation required for awake fibreoptic nasal intubation in patients with a difficult airway.

=== Adjunct in general anesthesia ===
It has also been used as an adjunct infusion during general anesthesia. In this application, it has been shown to decrease post-operative delirium, pain, nausea and opioid use.

=== Agitation ===
Dexmedetomidine was approved by the FDA in a sublingual formulation for the treatment of agitation in schizophrenia and bipolar disorder in 2022.

=== Others ===
Dexmedetomidine may be useful for the treatment of the adverse cardiovascular effects of acute amphetamine and cocaine intoxication and overdose. It has also been used as an adjunct to neuroaxial anesthesia for lower limb procedures.

== Contraindications ==
There are no contraindications to the use of dexmedetomidine in either its intravenous or sublingual/buccal forms. However, there are various warnings and precautions.

== Side effects ==
Side effects of dexmedetomidine include somnolence, oral paresthesia or hypoesthesia, dizziness, dry mouth, hypotension, orthostatic hypotension, bradycardia, bradypnea, hypertension, and nausea. The drug's side effects vary by type and incidence depending on whether it is used intravenously versus bucally or sublingually. The major side effect of the buccal/sublingual form is somnolence, including additional symptoms like fatigue and sluggishness, which occurred at rates of 22 to 23% versus 6% with placebo.

Dexmedetomidine has a biphasic effect on blood pressure with lower readings at lower drug concentrations and higher readings at higher concentrations. Common side effects include hypotension, hypertension, with slight decreases in heart rate, arrhythmias, and hypoxia. Toxic doses may cause first-degree or second-degree atrioventricular block. These adverse events usually occur briefly after administering a loading dose of the drug. Thus, adverse effects may be reduced by omitting a loading dose.

Prolonged use of dexmedetomidine (e.g., >24 hours) is associated with tolerance and tachyphylaxis.

== Interactions ==
Dexmedetomidine may enhance the effects of other sedatives and anesthetics when co-administered. Similarly, drugs that lower blood pressure and heart rate, such as beta blockers, may also have enhanced effects when co-administered with dexmedetomidine.

== Pharmacology ==
=== Pharmacodynamics ===
Dexmedetomidine at targets
Site	K_{i} (nM)	Species	Ref
α_{1}	5	Human	
α_{1A}	200	Human	
α_{1B}	316	Human	
α_{1D}	79	Human	
α_{2A}	0.015–16	Human	
α_{2B}	2.0–34	Human	
α_{2C}	15–95	Human	
I_{1}	200	Bovine	
I_{2}	50	Rat	
NET	>1,000	Human	

Dexmedetomidine is a highly selective α_{2}-adrenergic receptor agonist. It possesses an α_{2}:α_{1} selectivity ratio of 1,620:1, making it 8 times more selective for the α_{2}-adrenergic receptor than the related drug clonidine.

Unlike opioids and other sedatives such as propofol, dexmedetomidine is able to achieve its effects without causing respiratory depression. Dexmedetomidine induces sedation by decreasing activity of noradrenergic neurons in the locus ceruleus in the brain stem, thereby increasing the downstream activity of inhibitory γ-aminobutyric acid (GABA) neurons in the ventrolateral preoptic nucleus. In contrast, other sedatives like propofol and benzodiazepines directly increase activity of GABAergic neurons. Through action on this endogenous sleep-promoting pathway the sedation produced by dexmedetomidine more closely mirrors natural sleep (specifically stage 2 non-rapid eye movement sleep (NREM)), as demonstrated by EEG studies. Additionally, dexmedetomidine produces less amnesia than benzodiazepines, with significant amnestic effects occurring only at high plasma concentrations.

Dexmedetomidine also has analgesic effects at the spinal cord level and other supraspinal sites.

=== Pharmacokinetics ===
==== Absorption ====
The bioavailability of dexmedetomidine is 16% orally (swallowed), 72% sublingually, 82% buccally, 88% transdermally, and 73 to 104% intramuscularly. Intravenous dexmedetomidine exhibits linear pharmacokinetics with a rapid distribution half-life of approximately 6 minutes in healthy volunteers, and a longer and more variable distribution half-life in ICU patients. It can also be absorbed sublingually.

==== Distribution ====
The volume of distribution of dexmedetomidine is approximately 118 L. The plasma protein binding of dexmedetomidine is about 94% (mostly albumin).

==== Metabolism ====
Dexmedetomidine is metabolized by the liver, largely by glucuronidation (34%) as well as by oxidation via CYP2A6 and other cytochrome P450 enzymes. As such, it should be used with caution in people with liver disease or hepatic impairment.

==== Elimination ====
The majority of metabolized dexmedetomidine is excreted in the urine (~95%). The terminal elimination half-life of intravenous dexmedetomidine ranged 2.1 to 3.1 hours in healthy adults and 2.2 to 3.7 hours in ICU patients. Other research has found a half-life of 1.78 to 2.50 hours intravenously and of 2.8 hours sublingually or buccally.

== Chemistry ==
=== Synthesis ===
The chemical synthesis of dexmedetomidine has been described.

=== Analogues ===
Analogues of dexmedetomidine include clonidine, tizanidine, and xylazine, among others.

== History ==
Dexmedetomidine was developed by Orion Pharma and is marketed under the names dexdor and Precedex; in 1999 the US Food and Drug Administration (FDA) approved it as a short-term sedative and analgesic (<24 hours) for critically ill or injured people on mechanical ventilation in the intensive care unit. The rationale for its short-term use was due to concerns over withdrawal side effects such as rebound high blood pressure. These effects have not been consistently observed in research studies, however.

== Society and culture ==
=== Names ===
Dexmedetomidine is the generic name of the drug and its INN, USAN, and BAN. It is also known by its developmental code names MPV-1440 and BXCL-501 and by its major brand names Precedex and Igalmi among others.

== Veterinary use ==
Dexmedetomidine, under the brand name Dexdomitor (Orion Corporation), was approved in the European Union for use in cats and dogs in 2002, for sedation and induction of general anesthesia. The FDA approved dexmedetomidine for use in dogs in 2006 and cats in 2007. Dexmedetomidine has supplanted xylazine as a sedative for cats and dogs in several countries. Dexmedetomidine is used off-label in horses.

In 2015, the European Medicines Agency and the FDA approved an oromucosal gel form of dexmedetomidine marketed as Sileo by pharmaceutical company Zoetis for use in dogs for relief of noise aversion.

A study of dogs anaesthetised with isoflurane found that a constant rate infusion of dexmedetomidine improved ventilation, oxygenation, and respiration.

== Research ==
=== Insomnia ===
A sublingual formulation of dexmedetomidine with the code name RE-03 is under development by Reconnect Labs for the treatment of insomnia. As of August 2026, it is in phase 2 clinical trials for this indication.
