= Mirtazapine =

Antidepressant medication

Clinical data
- Trade names: Remeron, others
- Other names: Mepirzapine; 6-Azamianserin; ORG-3770
- AHFS/Drugs.com: Monograph
- MedlinePlus: a697009
- License data: US DailyMed: Mirtazapine
- Pregnancy category: AU: B3
- Routes of administration: By mouth, topical
- Drug class: Noradrenergic and specific serotonergic antidepressant (NaSSA)
- ATC code: N06AX11 (WHO)

Legal status
- Legal status: AU: S4 (Prescription only); BR: Class C1 (Other controlled substances); CA: ℞-only; UK: POM (Prescription only); US: ℞-only; EU: Rx-only

Pharmacokinetic data
- Bioavailability: 50%
- Protein binding: 85%
- Metabolism: Liver (CYP1A2, CYP2D6, CYP3A4)
- Metabolites: Desmethylmirtazapine (contributes 3–10% of activity)
- Elimination half-life: 20–40 hours
- Excretion: Urine: 75% Feces: 15%

Identifiers
- IUPAC name: (±)-5-methyl-2,5,19-triazatetracyclo[13.4.0.02,7.08,13]nonadeca-1(15),8,10,12,16,18-hexaene
- CAS Number: 85650-52-8
- PubChem CID: 4205
- IUPHAR/BPS: 7241
- DrugBank: DB00370
- ChemSpider: 4060
- UNII: A051Q2099Q
- KEGG: D00563
- ChEBI: CHEBI:6950
- ChEMBL: ChEMBL654
- CompTox Dashboard (EPA): DTXSID0023325
- ECHA InfoCard: 100.080.027

Chemical and physical data
- Formula: C_{17}H_{19}N_{3}
- Molar mass: 265.360 g·mol^{−1}
- 3D model (JSmol): Interactive image
- Chirality: Racemic mixture
- Density: 1.22 g/cm^{3}
- Melting point: 114 to 116 °C (237 to 241 °F)
- Boiling point: 432 °C (810 °F)
- Solubility in water: Soluble in methanol and chloroform mg/mL (20 °C)
- SMILES: n1cccc3c1N4C(c2ccccc2C3)CN(C)CC4
- InChI: InChI=1S/C17H19N3/c1-19-9-10-20-16(12-19)15-7-3-2-5-13(15)11-14-6-4-8-18-17(14)20/h2-8,16H,9-12H2,1H3; Key:RONZAEMNMFQXRA-UHFFFAOYSA-N

Mirtazapine, sold under the brand name Remeron among others, is an atypical tetracyclic antidepressant, and as such is used primarily to treat depression. Its effects may take up to four weeks but can also manifest as early as one to two weeks. It is often used in cases of depression complicated by anxiety or insomnia. The effectiveness of mirtazapine is comparable to other commonly prescribed antidepressants. It is taken by mouth.

Common side effects include sleepiness, dizziness, increased appetite, and weight gain. Serious side effects may include mania, low white blood cell count, and increased suicide among children. Withdrawal symptoms may occur when stopping. It is not recommended together with a monoamine oxidase inhibitor, although evidence supporting the danger of this combination has been challenged. It is unclear if use during pregnancy is safe. How it works is not clear, but it may involve blocking certain adrenergic and serotonin receptors. Chemically, it is a tetracyclic antidepressant, and is closely related to mianserin. It also has strong antihistaminergic effects.

Mirtazapine came into medical use in the United States in 1996. The patent expired in 2004, and generic versions are available. In 2023, it was the 99th most commonly prescribed medication in the United States, with more than 6 million prescriptions.

== Medical uses ==
Mirtazapine is approved by the United States Food and Drug Administration for the treatment of major depressive disorder in adults.

=== Depression ===
Mirtazapine is primarily used for major depressive disorder and other mood disorders. Onset of action appears faster than some selective serotonin reuptake inhibitors and similar to tricyclic antidepressants.

In 2010, the National Institute for Health and Care Excellence recommended generic selective serotonin reuptake inhibitors as first-line choices, as they are "equally effective as other antidepressants and have a favourable risk–benefit ratio." For mirtazapine, it found "no difference between mirtazapine and other antidepressants on any efficacy measure, although in terms of achieving remission mirtazapine appears to have a statistical though not clinical advantage. Mirtazapine has a statistical advantage over selective serotonin reuptake inhibitors in terms of reducing symptoms of depression, but the difference is not clinically significant. However, there is strong evidence that patients taking mirtazapine are less likely to leave treatment early because of side effects, although this is not the case for patients reporting side effects or leaving treatment early for any reason."

A 2011 Cochrane review comparing mirtazapine to other antidepressants found that while it appeared to have a faster onset in people for whom it worked (measured at two weeks), its efficacy was about the same as other antidepressants after six weeks' use.

A 2012 review focused on antidepressants and sleep found that mirtazapine reduced the time it took to fall asleep and improved the quality of sleep in many people with sleep disorders caused by depression, but that it could also disturb sleep in many people, especially at higher doses, causing restless leg syndrome in 8 to 28% of people and in rare cases causes REM sleep behavior disorder. This seemingly paradoxical dose–response curve of mirtazapine with respect to somnolence is owed to the exceptionally high affinity of the drug for the histamine H_{1}, 5-HT_{2A}, and 5-HT_{2C} receptors; exhibiting near exclusive occupation of these receptors at doses ≤15 mg. However, at higher doses, inverse agonism and constitutive activation of the α_{2A}-, α_{2B}-, and α_{2C}-adrenergic receptors begins to offset activity at H_{1} receptors leading to decreased somnolence and even a subjective sensation of "activation" in treated patients.

A 2018 analysis of 21 antidepressants found them to be fairly similar overall. It found tentative evidence for mirtazapine being in the more effective group and middle in tolerability.

After one week of usage, mirtazapine was found to have an earlier onset of action compared to selective serotonin reuptake inhibitors.

=== Other ===
There is also some evidence supporting its use in treating the following conditions, for which it is sometimes prescribed off-label:

- Generalized anxiety disorder
- Social anxiety disorder
- Obsessive–compulsive disorder
- Panic disorder
- Post-traumatic stress disorder
- Low appetite/underweight
- Insomnia
- Nausea and vomiting
- Itching
- Headaches and migraine

== Adverse effects ==
Very common (≥10% incidence) adverse effects include constipation, dry mouth, sleepiness, increased appetite (17%) and weight gain (>7% increase in <50% of children).

Common (1–10% incidence) adverse effects include weakness, confusion, dizziness, fasciculations (muscle twitches), peripheral edema (swelling, usually of the lower limbs), and abnormal lab results like elevated transaminases, elevated serum triglycerides, and elevated total cholesterol.

Mirtazapine may worsen symptoms of depression, anxiety and suicidal ideation.

Mirtazapine may cause serotonin syndrome, a potentially fatal condition. Cases of serotonin syndrome have been reported in patients taking mirtazapine in combination with other serotonergic drugs. Although some reviews have excluded mirtazapine as a causative agent based on inference, several clinical case reports directly implicate mirtazapine monotherapy in severe cases of serotonin syndrome. Another report documents the onset of serotonin syndrome shortly after the administration of a low dose of mirtazapine.

Mirtazapine has been reported to counteract the effect of clonidine, leading to dangerous increases in blood pressure.

Mirtazapine may induce arthralgia (non-inflammatory joint pain).

Compared to other antidepressants, mirtazapine has an increased mortality rate. It is also more likely to cause weight gain, drowsiness, nightmare disorder, sleepwalking, restless legs syndrome, night terrors and sleep paralysis.

=== Withdrawal ===
Stopping mirtazapine and other antidepressants may cause withdrawal symptoms. A gradual and slow reduction in dose is recommended to minimize such symptoms. Effects of sudden cessation of treatment with mirtazapine may include depression, anxiety, tinnitus, panic attacks, vertigo, restlessness, irritability, decreased appetite, insomnia, diarrhea, nausea, vomiting, flu-like symptoms, allergy-like symptoms such as pruritus, headaches, and sometimes mania or hypomania.

== Overdose ==
Mirtazapine is considered to be relatively safe in the event of an overdose, although it is considered slightly more toxic in overdose than most of the selective serotonin reuptake inhibitors (except citalopram). Unlike the tricyclic antidepressants, mirtazapine showed no significant cardiovascular adverse effects at 7 to 22 times the maximum recommended dose.

Twelve deaths have been attributed to mirtazapine overdose. The fatal toxicity index (deaths per million prescriptions) for mirtazapine is 3.1 (95% CI: 0.1 to 17.2). This is similar to that observed with selective serotonin reuptake inhibitors.

== Interactions ==
Concurrent use with inhibitors or inducers of the cytochrome P450 isoenzymes CYP1A2, CYP2D6, or CYP3A4 can result in altered concentrations of mirtazapine, as these are the main enzymes responsible for its metabolism. As examples, fluoxetine and paroxetine, inhibitors of these enzymes, are known to modestly increase mirtazapine levels, while carbamazepine, an inducer, considerably decreases them. Liver impairment and moderate chronic kidney disease have been reported to decrease the oral clearance of mirtazapine by about 30%; severe kidney disease decreases it by 50%.

Augmentation strategies combining mirtazapine with a selective serotonin reuptake inhibitor, serotonin–norepinephrine reuptake inhibitor, or tricyclic antidepressant are commonly employed and are considered relatively safe. However, a combination with fluvoxamine may lead to a substantial increase in mirtazapine blood plasma levels due to inhibition of isoenzymes responsible for the metabolic clearing of the compound. Furthermore, serotonin syndrome, a potentially fatal condition, has been reported when mirtazapine is combined with serotogenic agents (SSRIs olanzapine, quetiapine, tramadol and venlafaxine.) The combination of venlafaxine and mirtazapine is sometimes referred to as "California rocket fuel".

According to information from the manufacturers, mirtazapine should not be started within two weeks of any monoamine oxidase inhibitor usage; likewise, monoamine oxidase inhibitors should not be administered within two weeks of discontinuing mirtazapine.

The addition of mirtazapine to a monoamine oxidase inhibitor, while potentially having typical or idiosyncratic (unique to the individual) reactions not herein described, does not appear to cause serotonin syndrome. This is per the fact that the 5-HT_{2A} receptor is the predominant serotonin receptor thought to be involved in the pathophysiology of serotonin syndrome (with the 5-HT_{1A} receptor seeming to be protective). Mirtazapine is a potent 5-HT_{2A} receptor antagonist, and cyproheptadine, a medication that shares this property, mediates recovery from serotonin syndrome and is an antidote against it.

There is a possible interaction that results in a hypertensive crisis when mirtazapine is given to a patient who has already been on steady doses of clonidine. This involves a subtle consideration, when patients have been on chronic therapy with clonidine and suddenly stop the dosing, a rapid hypertensive rebound sometimes (20%) occurs from increased sympathetic outflow. Clonidine's blood pressure lowering effects are due to stimulation of presynaptic α_{2} autoreceptors in the CNS which suppress sympathetic outflow. Mirtazapine itself blocks these same α_{2} autoreceptors, so the effect of adding mirtazapine to a patient stabilized on clonidine may precipitate withdrawal symptoms.

== Pharmacology ==
=== Pharmacodynamics ===
Mirtazapine
	K_{i} (nM)	Species	Ref
SERT	10000+	Human	
NET	4600+	Human	
DAT	10000+	Human	
5-HT_{1A}	3330–5010	Human	
5-HT_{1B}	3534–12600	Human	
5-HT_{1D}	794–5010	Human	
5-HT_{1E}	728	Human	
5-HT_{1F}	583	Human	
5-HT_{2A}	6.3–69	Human	
5-HT_{2B}	200	Human	
5-HT_{2C}	8.9–39	Human	
5-HT_{3}	8.1; 70 (IC_{50})	Human	
5-HT_{4L}	10000+	Human	
5-HT_{5A}	670	Human	
5-HT_{6}	ND	ND	ND
5-HT_{7}	265	Human	
α_{1A}	1815	Human	
α_{2A}	20–158	Human	
α_{2B}	88	Human	
α_{2C}	18–110	Human	
β	10000+	Human	
D_{1}	4167	Rat	
D_{2}	5454+	Human	
D_{3}	5723	Human	
D_{4}	2518	Human	
H_{1}	0.14–1.6	Human	
H_{2}	10000+	Rat	
H_{3}	83200	Human	
H_{4}	100000+	Human	
mACh	670	Human	
VGSC	6905	Rat	
VDCC	10000+	Rat	
Values are K_{i} (nM). The smaller the value, the more strongly the drug binds to the site.

Mirtazapine is sometimes described as a noradrenergic and specific serotonergic antidepressant (NaSSA). It is a tetracyclic piperazine-azepine.

Mirtazapine has antihistamine, α_{2}-blocker, and antiserotonergic activity. It is specifically a potent antagonist or inverse agonist of the α_{2A}-, α_{2B}-, and α_{2C}-adrenergic receptors, the serotonin 5-HT_{2A}, 5-HT_{2C}, and the histamine H_{1} receptor. Unlike many other antidepressants, it does not inhibit the reuptake of serotonin, norepinephrine, or dopamine, nor does it inhibit monoamine oxidase. Similarly, mirtazapine has weak or no activity as an anticholinergic or blocker of sodium or calcium channels, in contrast to most tricyclic antidepressants. In accordance, it has better tolerability and low toxicity in overdose. As an H_{1} receptor antagonist, mirtazapine is extremely potent, and is in fact one of the most potent H_{1} receptor inverse agonists among tricyclic and tetracyclic antidepressants and most antihistamines in general. Antagonism of the H_{1} receptor is by far the strongest activity of mirtazapine, with the drug acting as a selective H_{1} receptor antagonist at low concentrations.

The (S)-(+) enantiomer of mirtazapine is responsible for antagonism of the serotonin 5-HT_{2A} and 5-HT_{2C} receptors, while the (R)-(–) enantiomer is responsible for antagonism of the 5-HT_{3} receptor. Both enantiomers are involved in antagonism of the H_{1} and α_{2}-adrenergic receptors, although the (S)-(+) enantiomer is the stronger antihistamine.

Although not clinically relevant, mirtazapine has been found to act as a partial agonist of the κ-opioid receptor at high concentrations (EC_{50} = 7200nM).

==== α_{2}-Adrenergic receptor ====
Antagonism of the α_{2}-adrenergic receptors, which function largely as inhibitory autoreceptors and heteroreceptors, enhances adrenergic and serotonergic neurotransmission, notably central 5-HT_{1A} receptor mediated transmission in the dorsal raphe nucleus and hippocampus; hence, mirtazapine's classification as a NaSSA. Indirect α_{1} adrenoceptor-mediated enhancement of serotonin cell firing and direct blockade of inhibitory α_{2} heteroreceptors located on serotonin terminals are held responsible for the increase in extracellular serotonin. Because of this, mirtazapine has been said to be a functional "indirect agonist" of the 5-HT_{1A} receptor. Increased activation of the central 5-HT_{1A} receptor is thought to be a major mediator of efficacy of most antidepressant drugs.

Mirtazapine's antagonism of α_{2}-adrenoreceptors is potentially functionally selective for presynaptic α_{2} receptors. Mirtazapine, at 25 μg/kg IV, in freely moving rats, enhanced the endogenous release of serotonin, specifically due to blockade of α2 heteroreceptors on serotonin neuron terminals, but required a dose of 500 μg/kg IV to block local norepinephrine mediated and postsynaptic α_{2} mediated inhibition of CA_{3} dorsal hippocampus pyramidal neurons in those rats. This is an approximate 20-fold functional selectivity for inhibiting presynaptic α2 over postsynaptic α_{2} (especially postsynaptic α2 in the rat hippocampus).

==== 5-HT_{2} receptor ====
Antagonism of the 5-HT_{2} subfamily of receptors and inverse agonism of the 5-HT_{2C} receptor appears to be in part responsible for mirtazapine's efficacy in the treatment of depressive states. Mirtazapine increases dopamine release in the prefrontal cortex. Accordingly, it was shown that by blocking the α_{2}-adrenergic receptors and 5-HT_{2C} receptors mirtazapine disinhibited dopamine and norepinephrine activity in these areas in rats. Mirtazapine's antagonism of 5-HT_{2A} receptors has beneficial effects on anxiety, sleep and appetite, as well as sexual function regarding the latter receptor. Mirtazapine has been shown to lower drug seeking behaviour (more specifically to methamphetamine) in various human and animal studies. It is also being investigated in substance abuse disorders to reduce withdrawal effects and improve remission rates.

Mirtazapine significantly improves pre-existing symptoms of nausea, vomiting, diarrhea, and irritable bowel syndrome in affected individuals. Mirtazapine may be used as an inexpensive antiemetic alternative to Ondansetron. In conjunction with substance abuse counseling, mirtazapine has been investigated for the purpose of reducing methamphetamine use in dependent individuals with success. In contrast to mirtazapine, the selective serotonin reuptake inhibitors, serotonin–norepinephrine reuptake inhibitors, monoamine oxidase inhibitors, and some tricyclic antidepressants acutely increase the general activity of the 5-HT_{2A}, 5-HT_{2C}, and 5-HT_{3} receptors, leading to a number of negative changes and side effects, the most prominent of which include anorexia, insomnia, nausea, and diarrhea, among others. However, most of these adverse effects are temporary, since down regulation of 5-HT_{2A} receptors eventually occurs following chronic SSRI treatment, and desensitization of 5-HT_{3} receptors often occurs within a week or less. This is precisely why SSRIs have a delayed antidepressant and anxiolytic effect, and occasionally, an acute anxiogenic effect before down regulation occurs. Mirtazapine, on the other hand, is an antagonist of the 5-HT_{2A} receptor, and antagonists at this receptor typically induce reverse tolerance. Thus, the antidepressant and anxiolytic effects of mirtazapine occur more rapidly than with SSRIs. Furthermore, its reduced incidence of sexual dysfunction (such as loss of libido and anorgasmia) could be a product of negligible binding to the serotonin transporter and antagonism of the 5-HT_{2A} receptors; however, Mirtazapine's high affinity towards and inverse agonism of the 5-HT_{2C} receptors may greatly attenuate those pro-sexual factors (as evidenced by the pro-sexual effects of drugs like m-CPP and lorcaserin which agonize 5-HT_{2C} receptors in a reasonably selective manner). As a result, it is often combined with these drugs to reduce their side-effect profile and to produce a stronger antidepressant effect.

==== 5-HT_{3} receptor ====
(R)-(–)-mirtazapine is a potent 5-HT_{3} blocker. It may relieve chemotherapy-related and advanced cancer-related nausea.

==== H_{1} receptor ====
Mirtazapine is a very strong H_{1} receptor antagonist and, as a result, it can cause powerful sedative and hypnotic effects. A single 15 mg dose of mirtazapine to healthy volunteers has been found to result in over 80% occupancy of the H_{1} receptor and to induce intense sleepiness. After a short period of chronic treatment, however, the H_{1} receptor tends to sensitize and the antihistamine effects become more tolerable. Many patients may also dose at night to avoid the effects, and this appears to be an effective strategy for combating them. Blockade of the H_{1} receptor may improve pre-existing allergies, pruritus, nausea, and insomnia in affected individuals. It may also contribute to weight gain, however. In contrast to the H_{1} receptor, mirtazapine has only low affinity for the muscarinic acetylcholine receptors, although anticholinergic side effects like dry mouth, constipation, and mydriasis are still sometimes seen in clinical practice.

=== Pharmacokinetics ===
The oral bioavailability of mirtazapine is about 50%. It is found mostly bound to plasma proteins, about 85%. It is metabolized primarily in the liver by N-demethylation and hydroxylation via cytochrome P450 enzymes, CYP1A2, CYP2D6, CYP3A4. The overall elimination half-life is 20–40 hours, and this is independent of dosage. It is conjugated in the kidney for excretion in the urine, where 75% of the drug is excreted, and about 15% is eliminated in feces. Desmethylmirtazapine is an active metabolite of mirtazapine which is believed to contribute about 3-10% to the drug's overall effects and has a half-life of about 25 hours.

Typical steady-state serum concentrations of mirtazapine range from 33 to 56 nmol/l after five daily doses of 7.5 mg mirtazapine or 41 and 74 nmol/l after 15 mg mirtazapine.

== Chemistry ==
Mirtazapine is a tetracyclic piperazinoazepine; mianserin was developed by the same team of organic chemists and mirtazapine differs from it via the addition of a nitrogen atom in one of the rings. It is a racemic mixture of enantiomers. The (S)-(+)-enantiomer is known as esmirtazapine.

Analogues of mirtazapine include mianserin, setiptiline, and aptazapine.

=== Synthesis ===
A chemical synthesis of mirtazapine has been published. The first step of synthesis is a condensation reaction between 2-chloro-3-cyanopyridine (1) and 1-methyl-3-phenylpiperazine (2) to give cyano compound 3. Hydrolysis of the cyanide group to the corresponding carboxylic acid (4), reduction to the alcohol (5) allows for mirtazapine (6) to be synthesised via an acid mediated cyclisation.

Route to mirtazapine.

== History ==
Mirtazapine was first synthesized at Organon and published in 1989, was first approved for use in major depressive disorder in the Netherlands in 1994, and was introduced in the United States in 1996 under the brand name Remeron.

== Society and culture ==
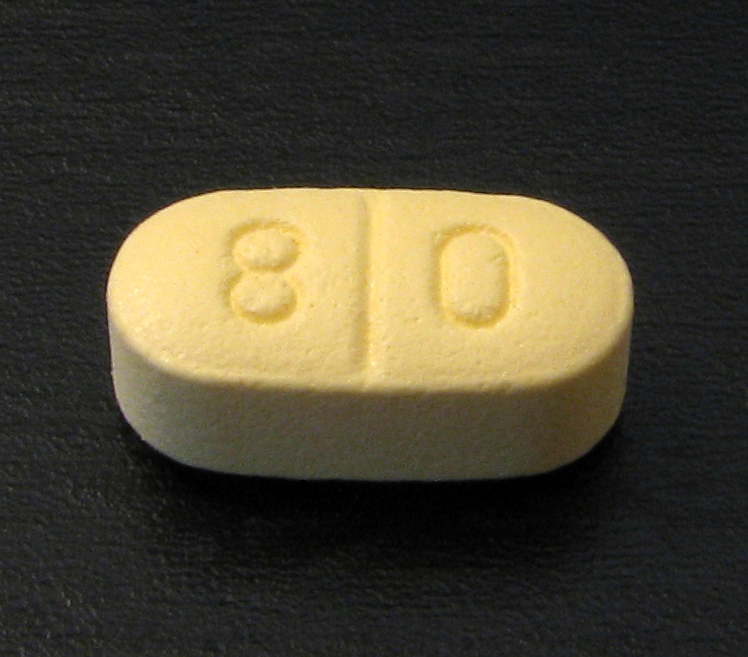
A 15 mg tablet of generic mirtazapine

=== Generic names ===
Mirtazapine is the English and French generic name of the drug and its INN, USAN, USP, BAN, DCF, and JAN. Its generic name in Spanish, Italian, and Portuguese is mirtazapina and in German, Turkish and Swedish is mirtazapin.

=== Brand names ===
Mirtazapine is marketed under many brand names worldwide, including Adco-Mirteron, Afloyan, Amirel, Arintapin Smelt, Avanza, Axit, Azapin, Beron, Bilanz, Blumirtax, Calixta, Ciblex, Combar, Comenter, Depreram, Esprital, Maz, Menelat, Mepirzapine, Merdaten, Meronin, Mi Er Ning, Milivin, Minelza, Minivane, Mirastad, Mirazep, Miro, Miron, Mirrador, Mirt, Mirta, Mirtabene, Mirtadepi, Mirtagamma, Mirtagen, Mirtalan, Mirtamor, Mirtamylan, Mirtan, Mirtaneo, Mirtanza, Mirtapax, Mirtapil, Mirtapine, Mirtaron, Mirtastad, Mirtax, Mirtaz, Mirtazap, Mirtazapin, Mirtazapina, Mirtazapine, Mirtazapinum, Mirtazelon, Mirtazon, Mirtazonal, Mirtel, Mirtimash, Mirtin, Mirtine, Mirtor, Mirzapine, Mirzaten, Mirzest, Mitaprex, Mitaxind, Mitocent, Mitrazin, Mizapin, Motofen, Mytra, Norset, Noxibel, Pharmataz, Promyrtil, Rapizapine, Ramure, Razapina, Redepra, Reflex, Remergil, Remergon, Remeron, Remirta, Rexer, Saxib, Sinmaron, Smilon, Tazepin, Tazimed, Tetrazic, Tifona, U-Mirtaron, U-zepine, Valdren, Vastat, Velorin, Yarocen, Zamir, Zania, Zapex, Zapsy, Zestat, Zismirt, Zispin, Zuleptan, and Zulin.

=== Music ===
Musician Hayley Williams wrote and released a song titled Mirtazapine describing her positive experience with the medication. In 2025 it was released on Ego Death at a Bachelorette Party, her third solo album.

== Research ==
The use of mirtazapine has been explored in several additional conditions:

- Found ineffective for Sleep apnea/hypopnea
- Secondary symptoms of autistic spectrum conditions and other pervasive developmental disorders
- Antipsychotic-induced akathisia.
- Drug withdrawal, dependence and detoxification
- Negative, depressive and cognitive symptoms of schizophrenia (as an adjunct)
- A case report has been published in which mirtazapine reduced visual hallucinations in a patient with Parkinson's disease psychosis (PDP). This is in alignment with recent findings that inverse agonists at the 5-HT_{2A} receptors are efficacious in attenuating the symptoms of Parkinson's disease psychosis. As is supported by the common practice of prescribing low-dose quetiapine and clozapine for PDP at doses too low to antagonize the D_{2} receptor, but sufficiently high doses to inversely agonize the 5-HT_{2A} receptors.
- Eight case reports have been reported in five papers on the use of mirtazapine in the treatment of hives as of 2017.
- Mirtazapine to alleviate severe breathlessness in patients with COPD or interstitial lung diseases (BETTER-B). Found ineffective and potentially harmful.

== Veterinary use ==
Mirtazapine also has some veterinary use in cats and dogs. Mirtazapine is sometimes prescribed as an appetite stimulant for cats or dogs experiencing loss of appetite due to acute post-surgical pain and medical conditions like chronic kidney disease. It is especially useful for treating combined poor appetite and nausea in cats and dogs.

There are two options for administration: tablets given orally, and an ointment applied topically to the inner surface of the ear. The most common side effects of the latter include local irritation or inflammation at the site where the ointment is applied and behavioural changes, such as increased meowing, hyperactivity, disoriented state, inability to coordinate muscle movements, lack of energy/weakness, attention-seeking, and aggression.
