= Oxaprotiline =

Chemical compound

Clinical data
- Routes of administration: Oral

Legal status
- Legal status: In general: uncontrolled

Identifiers
- IUPAC name: (±)-3-(9,10-ethano-9,10-dihydro-9-anthryl)-1-methylamino-2-propanol
- CAS Number: 56433-44-4
- PubChem CID: 38207
- ChemSpider: 35026
- UNII: 3V3Z2HK4LS
- ChEMBL: ChEMBL1213009
- CompTox Dashboard (EPA): DTXSID40866561

Chemical and physical data
- Formula: C_{20}H_{23}NO
- Molar mass: 293.410 g·mol^{−1}
- 3D model (JSmol): Interactive image
- SMILES: CNCC(CC12CCC(C3=CC=CC=C31)C4=CC=CC=C24)O
- InChI: InChI=1S/C20H23NO/c1-21-13-14(22)12-20-11-10-15(16-6-2-4-8-18(16)20)17-7-3-5-9-19(17)20/h2-9,14-15,21-22H,10-13H2,1H3; Key:FDXQKWSTUZCCTM-UHFFFAOYSA-N

Oxaprotiline (developmental code name C 49-802 BDA), also known as hydroxymaprotiline, is a norepinephrine reuptake inhibitor belonging to the tetracyclic antidepressant (TeCA) family and is related to maprotiline. Though investigated as an antidepressant, it was never marketed.

== Pharmacology ==
Dextroprotiline acts as a potent norepinephrine reuptake inhibitor and H_{1} receptor antagonist, as well as a very weak α_{1}-adrenergic receptor antagonist. It has negligible affinity for the serotonin transporter, dopamine transporter, α_{2}-adrenergic receptor, and muscarinic acetylcholine receptors. Whether it has any antagonistic effects on the 5-HT_{2}, 5-HT_{7}, or D_{2} receptors like its relative maprotiline is unclear.

Levoprotiline acts as a selective H_{1} receptor antagonist, with no affinity for adrenaline, dopamine, muscarinic acetylcholine, or serotonin receptors, or any of the monoamine transporters.

== Chemistry ==
Oxaprotiline is a racemic compound composed of two isomers, R(−)- or levo- oxaprotiline (levoprotiline; CGP-12,103-A), and S(+)- or dextro- oxaprotiline (dextroprotiline; CGP-12,104-A). Both enantiomers are active, with the levo- form acting as an antihistamine and the dextro- form having an additional pharmacology (see above), but with both unexpectedly still retaining antidepressant effects.

== See also ==
- Maprotiline
