= Aspergillus aerius =

Scientific classification
- Kingdom: Fungi
- Division: Ascomycota
- Class: Eurotiomycetes
- Order: Eurotiales
- Family: Aspergillaceae
- Genus: Aspergillus
- Species: A. aerius

Binomial name
- Aspergillus aerius A.J. Chen, J.C. Frisvad & R.A. Samson (2017)

Species of fungus

Aspergillus aerius is a species of fungus in the genus Aspergillus. It is from the Aspergillus section. The species was first described in 2017. It has been isolated from an air treatment system in a production plant in the Netherlands. It has been reported to produce auroglaucin, bisanthrons, dihydroauroglaucin, echinulins, erythroglaucin, flavoglaucin, isoechinulins, neoechinulins, physcion, tetracyclic, and tetrahydroauroglaucin.
