= LY-367642 =

Chemical compound

Identifiers
- IUPAC name: 1-[2-[4-(6-fluoro-1H-indol-3-yl)-3,6-dihydro-2H-pyridin-1-yl]-ethyl]-3-pyridin-4-yl-methyl-tetrahydro-pyrimidin-2-one
- CAS Number: 721417-29-4
- PubChem CID: 90710983
- ChemSpider: 129558218
- CompTox Dashboard (EPA): DTXSID001336905

Chemical and physical data
- Formula: C_{25}H_{28}FN_{5}O
- Molar mass: 433.531 g·mol^{−1}
- 3D model (JSmol): Interactive image
- SMILES: O=C(N(CC1=CC=NC=C1)CCC2)N2CCN3CCC(C4=CNC5=CC(F)=CC=C54)=CC3
- InChI: InChI=1S/C25H28FN5O/c26-21-2-3-22-23(17-28-24(22)16-21)20-6-12-29(13-7-20)14-15-30-10-1-11-31(25(30)32)18-19-4-8-27-9-5-19/h2-6,8-9,16-17,28H,1,7,10-15,18H2; Key:BMJOWGWDSXFWQE-UHFFFAOYSA-N

LY-367642 is a potent and selective serotonin 5-HT_{1D} receptor antagonist which has been used in research to study the function of presynaptic 5-HT_{1D} autoreceptors.
