= Tetracyclic =

Organic compound having 4 fused rings

Doxycycline, a tetracyclic antibiotic.

Mirtazapine, a tetracyclic antidepressant.

Tetracyclics are cyclic chemical compounds that contain four fused rings of atoms, for example, Tröger's base.

Some tricyclic compounds having three fused and one tethered ring (connected to main nucleus by a single bond) can also classified as tetracyclic, for example, ciclazindol.

Tetracyclic compounds have various pharmaceutical uses, such as:

- tetracycline antibiotics
  - Doxycycline
  - Tigecycline
  - Omadacycline
  - Eravacycline
- tetracyclic antidepressants
  - Benzoctamine
  - Loxapine
  - Mazindol
  - Mianserin
  - Mirtazapine

== See also ==
- Tricyclic
- Heterocyclic
