= C16H19N3 =

The molecular formula C_{16}H_{19}N_{3} (molar mass: 253.342 g/mol, exact mass: 253.1579 u) may refer to:

- Aptazapine (CGS-7525A)
- Solvent Yellow 56
