= Setiptiline =

Antidepressant drug

Clinical data
- Trade names: Tecipul
- Other names: Teciptiline; delta(13b,4a),4a-Carba-mianserin; MO-8282; ORG-8282
- AHFS/Drugs.com: International Drug Names
- Routes of administration: Oral
- ATC code: none

Legal status
- Legal status: In general: ℞ (Prescription only)

Identifiers
- IUPAC name: 2-methyl-2,3,4,9-tetrahydro-1H-dibenzo[3,4:6,7]cyclohepta[1,2-c]pyridine
- CAS Number: 57262-94-9
- PubChem CID: 5205
- DrugBank: DB09304
- ChemSpider: 5016
- UNII: 7L38105Z6E
- KEGG: D08511
- ChEBI: CHEBI:135076
- CompTox Dashboard (EPA): DTXSID50205886
- ECHA InfoCard: 100.055.123

Chemical and physical data
- Formula: C_{19}H_{19}N
- Molar mass: 261.368 g·mol^{−1}
- 3D model (JSmol): Interactive image
- SMILES: c42c(\C3=C(/c1ccccc1C2)CN(C)CC3)cccc4
- InChI: InChI=1S/C19H19N/c1-20-11-10-18-16-8-4-2-6-14(16)12-15-7-3-5-9-17(15)19(18)13-20/h2-9H,10-13H2,1H3; Key:GVPIXRLYKVFFMK-UHFFFAOYSA-N

Setiptiline (brand name Tecipul), also known as teciptiline, is a tetracyclic antidepressant (TeCA) that acts as a noradrenergic and specific serotonergic antidepressant (NaSSA). It was launched in 1989 for the treatment of depression in Japan by Mochida.

== Pharmacology ==
=== Pharmacodynamics ===
Setiptiline
Site	K_{i} (nM)	Species	Ref
SERT	>10,000 (IC_{50})	Rat	
NET	220 (IC_{50})	Rat	
DAT	>10,000 (IC_{50})	Rat	
5-HT_{1A}	ND	ND	ND
5-HT_{2A}	ND	ND	ND
5-HT_{2C}	ND	ND	ND
α_{1}	ND	ND	ND
α_{2}	24.3 (IC_{50})	Rat	
H_{1}	ND	ND	ND
mACh	ND	ND	ND
Values are K_{i} (nM), unless otherwise noted. The smaller the value, the more strongly the drug binds to the site.

Setiptiline acts as a norepinephrine reuptake inhibitor, α_{2}-adrenergic receptor antagonist, and serotonin receptor antagonist, likely at the 5-HT_{2} subtypes, as well as an H_{1} receptor inverse agonist/antihistamine.

== Chemistry ==
Setiptiline has a tetracyclic structure and is a close analogue of mianserin and mirtazapine, with setiptiline being delta(13b,4a),4a-carba-mianserin, and mirtazapine being 6-azamianserin.

== See also ==
- Aptazapine
- Mianserin
- Mirtazapine
