= 11C ME@HAPTHI =

Chemical compound

Identifiers
- IUPAC name: (S)-1-(3-Hydroxy-4-([11C]methylamino)butyl)-3-phenyl-1,3-dihydrobenzo[c][1,2,5]thiadiazole,2,2-dioxide
- CAS Number: 1033218-58-4
- PubChem CID: 165360096
- ChemSpider: 129562584
- CompTox Dashboard (EPA): DTXSID601335993

Chemical and physical data
- Formula: C_{17}H_{21}N_{3}O_{3}S
- Molar mass: 347.43 g·mol^{−1}
- 3D model (JSmol): Interactive image
- SMILES: [11CH3]NC[C@@H](O)CCN1C2=C(C=CC=C2)N(C2=CC=CC=C2)S1(=O)=O
- InChI: InChI=1S/C17H21N3O3S/c1-18-13-15(21)11-12-19-16-9-5-6-10-17(16)20(24(19,22)23)14-7-3-2-4-8-14/h2-10,15,18,21H,11-13H2,1H3/t15-/m0/s1/i1-1; Key:OIFBYCGNUDQJBL-FZTOSIJBSA-N

[11C]ME@HAPTHI is a chemical compound used as a radiotracer to image the norepinephrine transporter (NET) protein using positron emission tomography (PET). The NET protein is of research interest for its role in various neuropsychiatric disorders, such as ADHD and depression.
