= Aptazapine =

Chemical compound

Clinical data
- ATC code: none

Identifiers
- IUPAC name: 2-methyl-1,3,4,14b-tetrahydro-2H,10H-pyrazino[1,2-a]pyrrolo[2,1-c][1,4]benzodiazepine
- CAS Number: 71576-40-4
- PubChem CID: 51355
- ChemSpider: 46513
- UNII: 240J927J1R
- KEGG: D02972
- ChEMBL: ChEMBL336712
- CompTox Dashboard (EPA): DTXSID40868020

Chemical and physical data
- Formula: C_{16}H_{19}N_{3}
- Molar mass: 253.349 g·mol^{−1}
- 3D model (JSmol): Interactive image
- SMILES: c42c(N3C(c1cccn1C2)CN(CC3)C)cccc4
- InChI: InChI=1S/C16H19N3/c1-17-9-10-19-14-6-3-2-5-13(14)11-18-8-4-7-15(18)16(19)12-17/h2-8,16H,9-12H2,1H3; Key:MNHDDERDSNZCCK-UHFFFAOYSA-N

Aptazapine (developmental code name CGS-7525A) is a tetracyclic antidepressant (TeCA) that was assayed in clinical trials for the treatment of depression in the 1980s but was never marketed. It is a potent α_{2}-adrenergic receptor antagonist with about 10 times the strength of the related compound mianserin and has also been shown to act as a 5-HT_{2} receptor antagonist and H_{1} receptor inverse agonist, while having no significant effects on the reuptake of serotonin or norepinephrine. Based on its pharmacological profile, aptazapine may be classified as a noradrenergic and specific serotonergic antidepressant (NaSSA).

== See also ==
- Mianserin
- Mirtazapine
- Setiptiline
