= S32212 =

Chemical compound

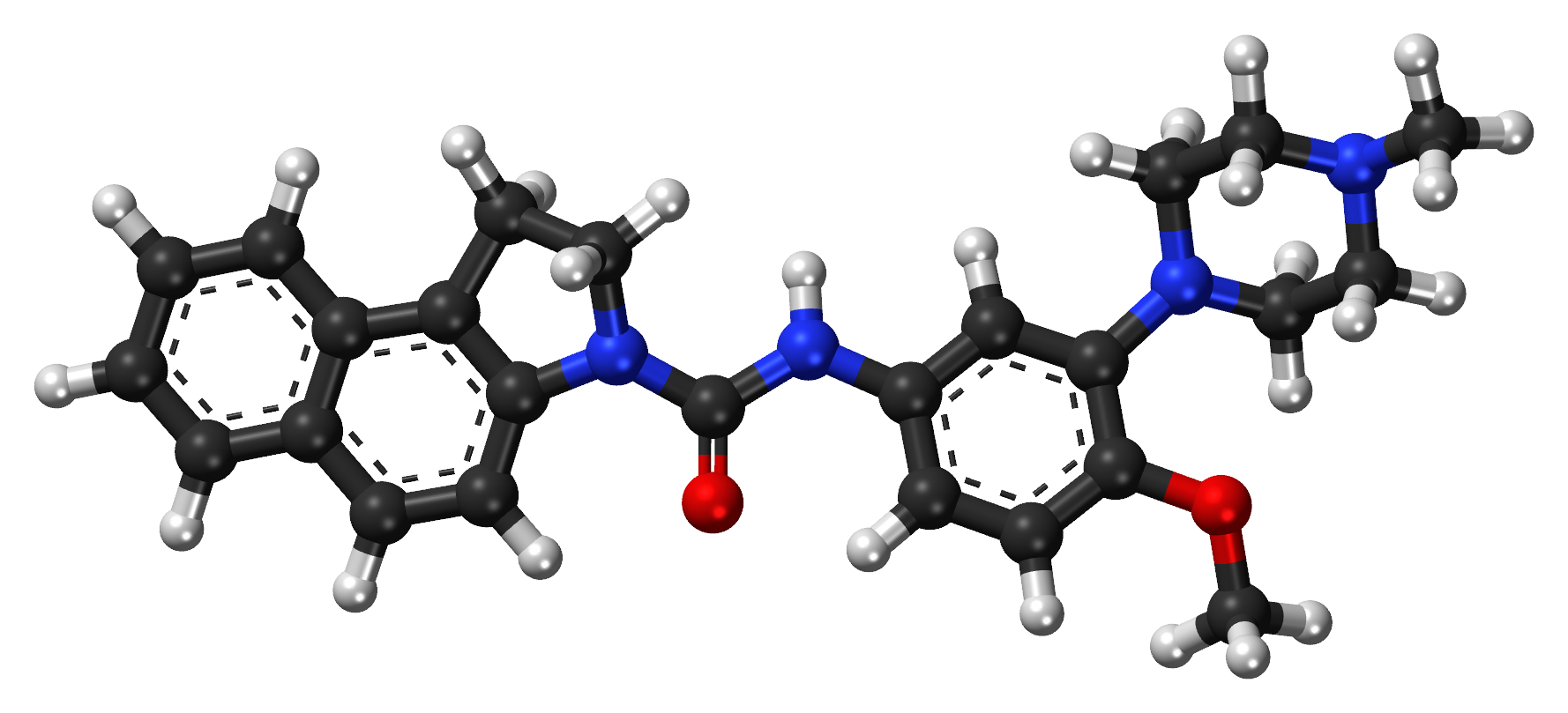

Clinical data
- ATC code: None

Identifiers
- IUPAC name: N-[4-methoxy-3-(4-methylpiperazin-1-yl)phenyl]-1,2-dihydro-3H-benzo[e]indole-3-carboxamide
- CAS Number: 847968-58-5
- PubChem CID: 11384503
- ChemSpider: 9559416
- CompTox Dashboard (EPA): DTXSID201030313

Chemical and physical data
- Formula: C_{25}H_{28}N_{4}O_{2}
- Molar mass: 416.525 g·mol^{−1}
- 3D model (JSmol): Interactive image
- SMILES: O=C(N3c2ccc1c(cccc1)c2CC3)Nc4cc(c(OC)cc4)N5CCN(C)CC5
- InChI: InChI=1S/C25H28N4O2/c1-27-13-15-28(16-14-27)23-17-19(8-10-24(23)31-2)26-25(30)29-12-11-21-20-6-4-3-5-18(20)7-9-22(21)29/h3-10,17H,11-16H2,1-2H3,(H,26,30); Key:HNWBOBAUHUFDES-UHFFFAOYSA-N

S32212 is a drug which is under preclinical investigation as a potential antidepressant medicine. It behaves as a selective, combined 5-HT_{2C} receptor inverse agonist and α_{2}-adrenergic receptor antagonist (at all three subtypes—α_{2A}, α_{2B}, and α_{2C}) with additional 5-HT_{2A} and, to a lesser extent, 5-HT_{2B} receptor antagonistic properties, and lacks any apparent affinity for the monoamine reuptake transporters or for the α_{1}-adrenergic, H_{1}, or mACh receptors. This profile of activity is compatible with the definition of a noradrenergic and specific serotonergic antidepressant (NaSSA), and as such, S32212 could in turn be classified as a NaSSA.

In animal studies, S32212 raised BDNF concentrations in the hippocampus and amygdala, increased the firing rate of neurons in the adrenergic perikarya in the locus coeruleus, increased levels of norepinephrine in the frontal cortex and hippocampus, and elevated frontal cortex levels of dopamine and acetylcholine, though not of serotonin or histamine. It produces effects indicative of antidepressant, anxiolytic, antiobsessional, antiaggressive, and cognitive- and sleep-enhancing properties in animal models, all while not perturbing body weight or sexual behavior.

== See also ==
- Noradrenergic and specific serotonergic antidepressant
