= Mochida Pharmaceutical =

- Type: Public
- Traded as: TYO: 4534
- Industry: Pharmaceuticals
- Founded: 1945
- Headquarters: Tokyo, Japan
- Key people: Naoyuki Mochida (CEO)
- Number of employees: 1,762 (2006)
- Website: www.mochida.co.jp

Mochida Pharmaceutical Co., Ltd (持田製薬株式会社, mochida seiyaku kabushiki gaisha) is a Japanese pharmaceutical company.

One of its products is the antidepressant setiptiline (Tecipul).
