= Rs5569 =

SNP: rs5569
- Name(s): A1287G, G1287A
- Gene: SLC6A2
- Chromosome: 16
- Region: Exon 9

External databases
- Ensembl: Human SNPView
- dbSNP: 5569
- HapMap: 5569
- SNPedia: 5569

In genetics, rs5569 (A1287G or G1287A) is a genetic variant. It is a single nucleotide polymorphism (SNP) in the SLC6A2 gene in exon 9. This gene codes the norepinephrine transporter. The SNP is a silent substitution and the nucleotides of both variants code a threonine amino acid.

Several research studies have examined the effect of the variant in relation to alcohol dependence, attention deficit hyperactivity disorder, diabetes, major depressive disorder, panic disorder, Tourette syndrome and personality traits. None of the studies have found an association.
