= Ciclazindol =

Chemical compound

Clinical data
- Routes of administration: Oral
- ATC code: none

Pharmacokinetic data
- Metabolism: Renal
- Elimination half-life: ~32 hours
- Excretion: Urine, feces

Identifiers
- IUPAC name: 10-(3-Chlorophenyl)-3,4-dihydro-2H-pyrimido[1,2-a]indol-10-ol
- CAS Number: 37751-39-6
- PubChem CID: 37825
- ChemSpider: 34683
- UNII: Y3I9520J7P
- KEGG: D03486
- ChEMBL: ChEMBL1192491
- CompTox Dashboard (EPA): DTXSID50865883

Chemical and physical data
- Formula: C_{17}H_{15}ClN_{2}O
- Molar mass: 298.77 g·mol^{−1}
- 3D model (JSmol): Interactive image
- SMILES: Clc1cccc(c1)C3(O)c4c(N2\C3=N/CCC2)cccc4

Ciclazindol (WY-23409) is an antidepressant and anorectic drug of the tetracyclic chemical class that was developed in the mid to late 1970s, but was never marketed. It acts as a norepinephrine reuptake inhibitor, and to a lesser extent as a dopamine reuptake inhibitor. Ciclazindol has no effects on the SERT, 5-HT receptors, mACh receptors, or α-adrenergic receptors, and has only weak affinity for the H_{1} receptor. As suggested by its local anesthetic properties, ciclazindol may also inhibit sodium channels. It is known to block potassium channels as well.

The dosage in human volunteers is stated to be 25 mg daily. However, doses of up to 200 mg have also been reported. This is surprising since the dosage of mazindol is only 2-4 mg per day.

Ciclazindol is reported to have an IC_{50} of 1.3 nM for the dopamine transporter (cmp 23).

== See also ==
- Mazindol
- Setazindol
