= Benzoctamine =

Sedative and anxiolytic medication

Clinical data
- Trade names: Tacitin
- Routes of administration: Oral, intravenous
- ATC code: N05BD01 (WHO)

Legal status
- Legal status: BR: Class C1 (Other controlled substances); In general: legal

Pharmacokinetic data
- Bioavailability: Oral: 90%
- Metabolism: Hepatic
- Elimination half-life: 2 to 3 hours
- Excretion: Renal

Identifiers
- IUPAC name: N-Methyl-9,10-ethanoanthracene-9(10H)-methanamine
- CAS Number: 17243-39-9
- PubChem CID: 28425
- DrugBank: DB09021
- ChemSpider: 26444
- UNII: 734MM7Y191
- ChEMBL: ChEMBL2104106
- CompTox Dashboard (EPA): DTXSID4022654

Chemical and physical data
- Formula: C_{18}H_{19}N
- Molar mass: 249.357 g·mol^{−1}
- 3D model (JSmol): Interactive image
- SMILES: c1ccc3c(c1)C4c2ccccc2C3(CC4)CNC
- InChI: InChI=1S/C18H19N/c1-19-12-18-11-10-13(14-6-2-4-8-16(14)18)15-7-3-5-9-17(15)18/h2-9,13,19H,10-12H2,1H3; Key:GNRXCIONJWKSEA-UHFFFAOYSA-N

Benzoctamine is a drug that possesses sedative and anxiolytic properties. Marketed as Tacitin by Ciba-Geigy, it is different from most sedative drugs because in most clinical trials it does not produce respiratory depression, but actually stimulates the respiratory system. As a result, when compared to other sedative and anxiolytic drugs such as benzodiazepines like diazepam, it is a safer form of tranquilizing. However, when co-administered with other drugs that cause respiratory depression, like morphine, it can cause increased respiratory depression.

Medically, benzoctamine is used as a treatment for anxious outpatients to control aggression, enuresis, fear, and minor social maladjustment in children. Its anxiolytic effects are most similar to diazepam, another anxiolytic, but unlike diazepam, benzoctamine has antagonistic effects on epinephrine and norepinephrine, and appears to increase serotonin levels. While little is understood about how it carries out its effects, studies point to reduced serotonin, epinephrine, and norepinephrine as partial causes of its pharmacologic and behavioral effects.

Animal studies have shown sedative hypnotic drugs tend to show dependency in animals, but benzoctamine has been shown to not be addictive. Other animal studies also point to the drug as a possible mechanism by which to reduce blood pressure through the adrenergic system.

Chemically, benzoctamine belongs to the class of compounds called dibenzobicyclo-octadienes. It is a tetracyclic compound, consisting of four rings in a three dimensional configuration, and is very closely related structurally to the tetracyclic antidepressant (TeCA) maprotiline, differing only in the length of their side chain.

== Medical uses ==
=== Anxiety ===
Benzoctamine's main clinical use is for the treatment of anxiety, and evidence points to it being as effective as other clinical anxiety drugs, in particular diazepam. In the treatment of symptoms of mild anxiety due to psychoneurosis, a daily dosage of 30 to 80 mg of benzoctamine was shown to be just as effective as 6–20 mg of diazepam. In another study one group of patients were given 10 mg of benzoctamine three times a day, while another group was given 5 mg of diazepam, and the treatments were equivalent. While these studies point to higher doses of benzoctamine being needed to exert the same pharmacological effects, the drug is still popular because of its ability to act as an anxiolytic without producing the common respiratory depression associated with other sedative drugs. Some studies have even shown that it stimulates the respiratory system.

==== Benzoctamine and sodium amylobarbitone ====
In a study used to compare benzoctamine to sodium amylobarbitone as a sleep promoter, it was found that during administration of both drugs, patients reported that their sleep was less restless, and drowsiness was diminished. The study further showed that while sodium amylobarbitone caused withdrawal rebound symptoms, benzoctamine did not. It was also found that benzoctamine reduced plasma corticosteroid hormone levels. There is a relationship between anxiety and adreno-corticosteroid activity, with raised levels commonly being reported as an indication of stress. The study showed that benzoctamine, a drug reported to reduce anxiety, was also able to reduce the hormones that potentially cause it. This points to a phenomenon often seen within pharmacology where drugs intended for other uses often have far-reaching and rarely considered effects.

==== Benzoctamine vs. chlordiazepoxide in anxiety neurosis ====
Benzoctamine has been found to have the same efficacy as chlordiazepoxide when treating anxiety neurosis.

=== Sleep sedation ===
While benzoctamine was made to be an alternative to the benzodiazepine line of anxiolytic drugs, other uses for the drug have been discovered. Due to benzoctamine's ability to tranquilize without causing respiratory depression, scientists are moving forward with studies that test its sedative effects in patients with respiratory failure. In one study that used benzoctamine in a clinical setting, researchers showed that the use of benzoctamine for sedation did not result in changes in forced expiratory volume in one second or carbon dioxide partial pressure (pCO_{2}). This confirmed previous statements that claimed the drug did not cause respiratory failure. The main goal of this clinical study was to confirm the findings of another study that showed benzoctamine did not reduce CO_{2} responsiveness, but instead increased the ventilatory response to CO_{2}.

There are usually many risks associated with using sedatives on patients who are suffering from respiratory failure, which has made it difficult to administer tranquillizing medications in situations when they are desirable. It is not known why this drug is safe and its benzodiazepine cousins are not, but a possible explanation for this phenomenon might come from its similarity in structure to tricyclic antidepressants, which have also been shown to not cause respiratory failure. While further experimentation is necessary, this study points to benzoctamine's possible consideration for sedation in respiratory failure patients.

=== Other uses ===
==== Hypertension ====
A possible treatment for hypertension is blocking peripheral vascular serotonergic neurons or alpha-adrenergic neurons on postsynaptic cell sites. One study showed that benzoctamine, a serotonin and alpha-adrenergic antagonist, does not reduce blood pressure through a seretonin mechanism but does reduce blood pressure by antagonizing alpha-adrenergic receptors in rats. Rats were given 10 mg of benzoctamine and drops in their blood pressure were approximately 30mm Hg. The researchers further confirmed that serotonin antagonism was not sufficient to reduce blood pressure by using the highly selective serotonin antagonist 1-(1-naphthyl)piperazine, which was not able to decrease the blood pressure of the rats. These studies have yet to be repeated in humans.

== Side effects ==
=== Common side effects ===
Common side effects include drowsiness (incidence of 9%), gastro-intestinal upset, dry mouth, headache, and dizziness (incidence of 1-2% each).

=== Serotonin turnover ===
Studies have shown that benzoctamine increases level of serotonin. Scientists confirmed these results and proposed that the method of action was inhibition of serotonin uptake since the drug also blocked the serotonin depleting action of extra-neuronal monoamine transporters (EMT). This would lead to increased stimulation of serotonin receptors through a negative feed back mechanism, eventually decreasing serotonin out put. However, the study points out that other studies have shown that drugs combined with EMT cause a lowering of body temperature that in fact results in a decrease in serotonin turnover. This means that body temperature effects cannot be ruled out.

== Pharmacology ==
Not much is understood about how benzoctamine produces its anti-anxiety effects, but rat studies have shown that the possible mechanism of action is by way of increased turnover of catecholamines. In addition to serotonin it has also been shown to decrease epinephrine, dopamine, and norepinephrine turnover by antagonizing their receptors. When given intravenously in doses of 20–40 mg there are no significant differences in efficacy. Oral doses exceeding 10 mg three times daily do not increase the effects of the drug. Assuming serotonin postsynaptic antagonism is the main mechanism by which benzoctamine carries out its effects, studies have shown it to have an IC_{50} value of 115 mM at the serotonin receptor.

== Pharmacokinetics ==
Benzoctamine can be injected directly into the blood or given as tablets. When given as tablets, it is given in doses of 10 mg three times daily. And when given intravenously, patients are given the drug at a rate of 5 mg/minute until 20–40 mg of drug has been injected. Benzoctamine can be analyzed as the ^{3}H acetyl derivative and N-methyl metabolite it gets broken down into using radioactive analysis. Benzoctamine has a half-life of 2–3 hours, with a bioavailability of around >90% when given orally. The average time to achieve peak plasma concentrations is 1 hour and the volume of distribution for a 70 kg person is 1–2 L/kg.

== See also ==
- Maprotiline
