= Esmirtazapine =

Drug formerly under development for treatment of menopause symptoms

Clinical data
- Routes of administration: Oral
- ATC code: none

Legal status
- Legal status: In general: uncontrolled

Pharmacokinetic data
- Metabolism: Liver (CYP2D6)
- Elimination half-life: 10 hours

Identifiers
- IUPAC name: (S)-1,2,3,4,10,14b-hexahydro-2-methylpyrazino(2,1-a)pyrido(2,3-c)(2)benzazepine
- CAS Number: 61337-87-9
- PubChem CID: 3085218; E. maleate: 6451144
- DrugBank: DB06678
- ChemSpider: 2342166
- UNII: 4685R51V7M
- KEGG: D04055
- CompTox Dashboard (EPA): DTXSID001029320
- ECHA InfoCard: 100.056.994

Chemical and physical data
- Formula: C_{17}H_{19}N_{3}
- Molar mass: 265.360 g·mol^{−1}
- 3D model (JSmol): Interactive image
- Melting point: 114 to 116 °C (237 to 241 °F)
- Solubility in water: Soluble in methanol and chloroform
- SMILES: CN1CCN2c3c(cccn3)Cc4ccccc4[C@H]2C1
- InChI: InChI=1S/C17H19N3/c1-19-9-10-20-16(12-19)15-7-3-2-5-13(15)11-14-6-4-8-18-17(14)20/h2-8,16H,9-12H2,1H3/t16-/m1/s1; Key:RONZAEMNMFQXRA-MRXNPFEDSA-N

Esmirtazapine (ORG-50,081) is a tetracyclic antidepressant drug that was under development by Organon for the treatment of insomnia, and for vasomotor symptoms associated with menopause (such as hot flashes) . Esmirtazapine is the (S)-(+)-enantiomer of mirtazapine; it has similar overall pharmacology as mirtazapine, including inverse agonist actions at H_{1} and 5-HT_{2} receptors, and antagonist actions at α_{2}-adrenergic receptors.

Notably, esmirtazapine has a shorter half life (around 10 hours), compared to R-mirtazapine and racemic mixture, which has a half-life of 18–40 hours. Merck has run several studies on low dose (3–4.5 mg) esmirtazapine for the treatment of insomnia. It is attractive for treating insomnia since it is a potent H_{1}-inhibitor and a 5-HT_{2A} antagonist. Unlike low-dose mirtazapine, the half life (10 hours) is short enough that next-day sedation may be manageable, however, for people with CYP2D6 polymorphisms, which constitute a sizable fraction of the population, the half-life is expected to be quite a bit longer. Merck researchers claimed that the incidence of next-day sedation was not a problem in one of their studies, but this claim has been challenged (15% of patients complained of daytime sleepiness vs 3.5% in the placebo group).

Merck terminated its internal clinical development program In March 2010 for esmirtazapine "for strategic reasons".

== See also ==
- List of investigational insomnia drugs
- Cidoxepin
