= Norepinephrine transporter =

Protein-coding gene in the species Homo sapiens

SLC6A2

Identifiers
- Aliases: SLC6A2, NAT1, NET, NET1, SLC6A5, solute carrier family 6 member 2, Norepinephrine transporter, norepinephrine transporter gene
- External IDs: OMIM: 163970; MGI: 1270850; GeneCards: SLC6A2

Gene location (Human)
Chr.	Chromosome 16 (human)
Band	16q12.2	Start	55,655,988 bp
Band	16q12.2	End	55,707,645 bp

Gene location (Mouse)
Chr.	Chromosome 8 (mouse)
Band	8 C5|8 44.99 cM	Start	93,686,707 bp
Band	8 C5|8 44.99 cM	End	93,728,295 bp
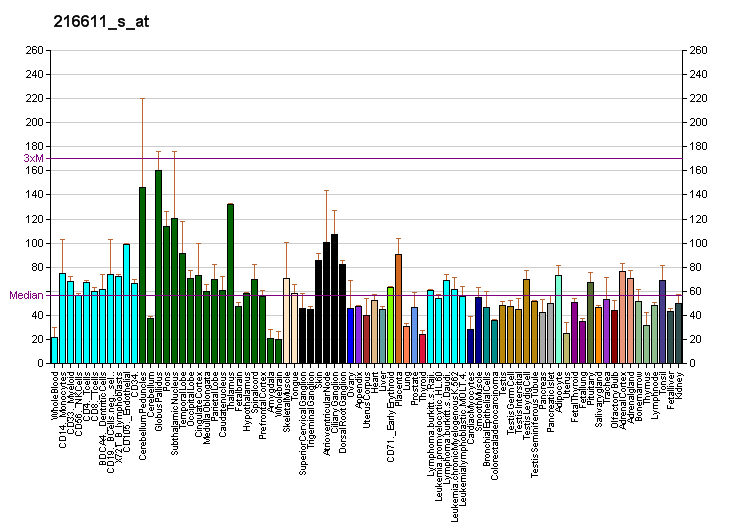

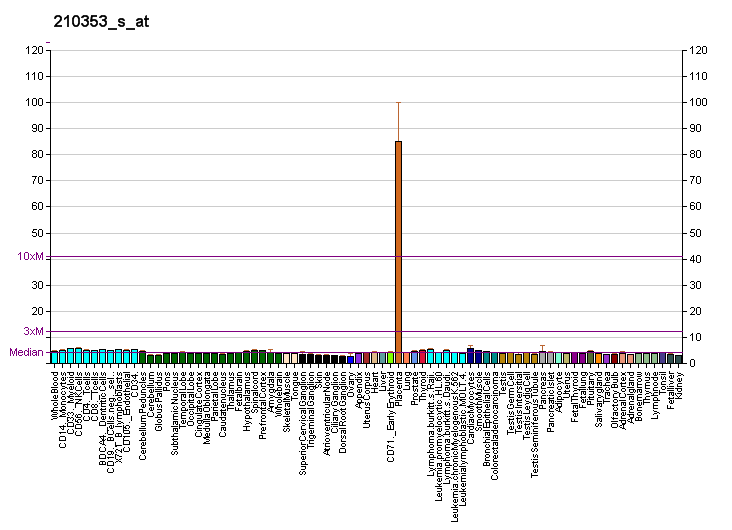

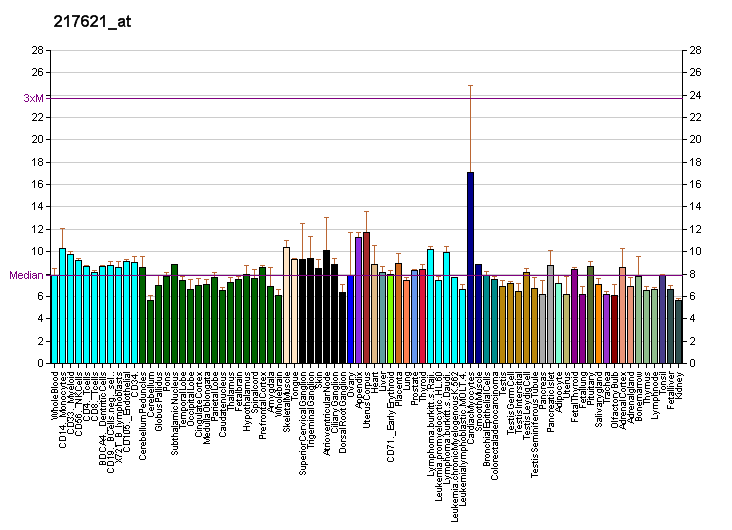
RNA expression pattern
Bgee	Human / Mouse (ortholog); Top expressed in: placenta; buccal mucosa cell; decidua; superior vestibular nucleus; caput epididymis; skin of thigh; glomerulus; metanephric glomerulus; left testis; nipple / Top expressed in: carotid body; decidua; gastrula; right lung lobe; maxillary nerve; external carotid artery; skin of external ear; upper lip; superior cervical ganglion; perirhinal cortex; More reference expression data
BioGPS	More reference expression data
Gene ontology
Molecular function	dopamine:sodium symporter activity; neurotransmitter:sodium symporter activity; norepinephrine:sodium symporter activity; monoamine transmembrane transporter activity; protein binding; symporter activity; metal ion binding; beta-tubulin binding; alpha-tubulin binding; actin binding
Cellular component	integral component of membrane; plasma membrane; membrane; membrane raft; neuron projection; cell surface; integral component of plasma membrane; neuronal cell body membrane; presynaptic membrane
Biological process	dopamine uptake involved in synaptic transmission; neurotransmitter transport; response to pain; monoamine transport; chemical synaptic transmission; norepinephrine transport; transmembrane transport; sodium ion transmembrane transport; norepinephrine uptake; neuron cellular homeostasis; neurotransmitter reuptake
Sources:Amigo / QuickGO
Orthologs
Databases	NCBI: entry; OMA: entry
Species	Human	Mouse
Entrez	6530	20538
Ensembl	ENSG00000103546	ENSMUSG00000055368
UniProt	P23975	O55192
RefSeq (mRNA)	NM_001043; NM_001172501; NM_001172502; NM_001172504	NM_009209
RefSeq (protein)	NP_001034; NP_001165972; NP_001165973; NP_001165975	NP_033235
Location (UCSC)	Chr 16: 55.66 – 55.71 Mb	Chr 8: 93.69 – 93.73 Mb
PubMed search
- Wikidata
View/Edit Human	View/Edit Mouse

The norepinephrine transporter, or more precisely sodium-dependent norepinephrine transporter (NET), also known as noradrenaline transporter, or more precisely sodium-dependent noradrenaline transporter (NAT), is a protein that in humans is encoded by the solute carrier family 6 member 2 (SLC6A2) gene.

NET is a monoamine transporter and is responsible for the sodium-chloride (Na^{+}/Cl^{−})-dependent reuptake of extracellular norepinephrine (NE), which is also known as noradrenaline. NET can also reuptake extracellular dopamine (DA). The reuptake of these two neurotransmitters is essential in regulating concentrations in the synaptic cleft. NETs, along with the other monoamine transporters, are the targets of many antidepressants and recreational drugs. In addition, altered NET availability is associated with ADHD. There is evidence that single-nucleotide polymorphisms in the NET gene (SLC6A2) may be an underlying factor in some of these disorders.

== Gene ==
The norepinephrine transporter gene, SLC6A2 is located on human chromosome 16 locus 16q12.2. This gene is encoded by 14 exons. Based on the nucleotide and amino acid sequence, the NET transporter consists of 617 amino acids with 12 membrane-spanning domains. The structural organization of NET is highly homologous to other members of a sodium/chloride-dependent family of neurotransmitter transporters, including dopamine, epinephrine, serotonin and GABA transporters.

=== Single-nucleotide polymorphisms ===
A single-nucleotide polymorphism (SNP) is a genetic variation in which a genome sequence is altered by a single nucleotide (A, T, C or G). NET proteins with an altered amino acid sequence (more specifically, a missense mutation) could potentially be associated with various diseases that involve abnormally high or low plasma levels of norepinephrine due to altered NET function. NET SNPs and possible associations with various diseases are an area of focus for many research projects. There is evidence suggesting a relationship between NET SNPs and various disorders such as ADHD psychiatric disorders, postural tachycardia and orthostatic intolerance. The SNPs rs3785143 and rs11568324 have been related to attention-deficit hyperactivity disorder. Thus far, however, the only confirmed direct association between a SNP and a clinical condition is that of the SNP, Ala457Pro, and orthostatic intolerance. Thirteen NET missense mutations have been discovered so far.

Missense Mutations in the NET Gene
Location	Amino Acid Variant	TMD (if known)	Related Disease
Exon 2	Val69Ile	TMD 1	None
Exon 3	Thr99Ile	TMD 2	None
Exon 5	Val245Ile	TMD 4	None
Exon 6	Asn292Thr	n/a	None
Exon 8	Val356Leu	n/a	None
Exon 8	Ala369Pro	n/a	None
Exon 8	Asn375Ser	n/a	None
Exon 10	Val449Ile	TMD 9	None
Exon 10	Ala457Pro	TMD 9	Orthostatic intolerance
Exon 10	Lys463Arg	n/a	None
Exon 11	Gly478Ser	TMD 10	None
Exon 12	Phe528Cys	n/a	None
Exon 13	Tyr548His	n/a	None

Abbreviations: TMD, transmembrane domain; n/a, non-applicable.
For the table above, refer to this table of standard amino acid abbreviations. This notation for
missense mutations, take Val69Ile for example, indicates that amino acid Val69 was changed to Ile.

=== Genetic variations ===
An epigenetic mechanism (hypermethylation of CpG islands in the NET gene promoter region) that results in reduced expression of the noradrenaline (norepinephrine) transporter and consequently a phenotype of impaired neuronal reuptake of norepinephrine has been implicated in both postural orthostatic tachycardia syndrome and panic disorder.

rs5569 is a variant of SLC6A2.

== Structure ==
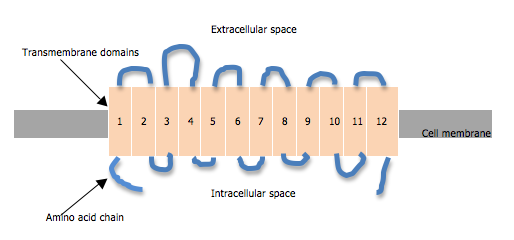
Simplified structure of the norepinephrine transporter protein.

The norepinephrine transporter is composed of 12 transmembrane domains (TMDs). The intracellular portion contains an amino (-NH_{2}) group and carboxyl (-COOH) group. In addition, there is a large extracellular loop located between TMD 3 and 4. The protein is composed of 617 amino acids.

== Function ==
NET functions to transport synaptically released norepinephrine back into the presynaptic neuron. As much as 90% of the norepinephrine released will be taken back up in the cell by NET. NET functions by coupling the influx of sodium and chloride (Na^{+}/Cl^{−}) with the transport of norepinephrine. This occurs at a fixed ratio of 1:1:1. Both the NET and the dopamine transporter (DAT) can transport norepinephrine and dopamine. The reuptake of norepinephrine and dopamine is essential in regulating the concentration of monoamine neurotransmitters in the synaptic cleft. The transporter also helps maintain homeostatic balances of the presynaptic neuron.

Norepinephrine structure

Norepinephrine (NE) is released from noradrenergic neurons that innervate both the CNS and PNS. NE, also known as noradrenaline (NA), has an important role in controlling mood, arousal, memory, learning, and pain perception. NE is a part of the sympathetic nervous system. Dysregulation of the removal of norepinephrine by NET is associated with many neuropsychiatric diseases, discussed below. In addition, many antidepressants and recreational drugs compete for the binding of NET with NE.

== Transport mechanisms ==
The transport of norepinephrine back into presynaptic cell is made possible by the cotransport with Na^{+} and Cl^{−}. The sequential binding of the ions results in the eventual reuptake of norepinephrine. The ion gradients of Na^{+} and Cl^{−} make this reuptake energetically favorable. The gradient is generated by the Na+/K+-ATPase which transports three sodium ions out and two potassium ions into the cell. NETs have conductances similar to those of ligand-gated ion channels. The expression of NET results in a leak-channel activity.

== Location in the nervous system ==
NETs are restricted to noradrenergic neurons and are not present on neurons that release dopamine or epinephrine. The transporters can be found along the cell body, axons, and dendrites of the neuron. NETs are located away from the synapse, where norepinephrine is released. They are found closer to the plasma membrane of the cell. This requires norepinephrine to diffuse from the site it is released to the transporter for reuptake. Norepinephrine transporters are confined to the neurons of the sympathetic system, and those innervating the adrenal medulla, lung, and placenta.

== Regulation ==
Regulation of NET function is complex and a focus of current research. NETs are regulated at both the cellular and molecular level post-translation. The most understood mechanisms include phosphorylation by the second messenger protein kinase C (PKC). PKC has been shown to inhibit NET function by sequestration of the transporter from the plasma membrane. The amino acid sequence of NET has shown multiple sites related to protein kinase phosphorylation. Post-translational modifications can have a wide range of effects on the function of the NET, including the rate of fusion of NET-containing vesicles with the plasma membrane, and transporter turnover.

== Clinical significance ==
=== Orthostatic intolerance ===
Orthostatic intolerance (OI) is a disorder of the autonomic nervous system (a subcategory of dysautonomia) characterized by the onset of symptoms upon standing. Symptoms include fatigue, lightheadedness, headache, weakness, increased heart rate/heart palpitations, anxiety, and altered vision. Often, patients have high plasma norepinephrine (NE) concentrations (at least 600 pg/ml) in relation to sympathetic outflow upon standing, suggesting OI is a hyperadrenergic condition. The discovery of identical twin sisters who both had OI suggested a genetic basis for the disorder. A missense mutation on the NET gene (SLC6A2) was discovered in which an alanine residue was replaced with a proline residue (Ala457Pro) in a highly conserved region of the transporter. The patients' defective NET had only 2% of the activity of the wild-type version of the gene. The genetic defect in the NET protein results in decreased NET activity that could account for abnormally high NE plasma levels in OI. However, 40 other OI patients did not have the same missense mutation, indicating other factors contributed to the phenotype in the identical twins. This discovery of the linkage with NET mutations that results in decreased norepinephrine reuptake activity and orthostatic intolerance suggests faulty NE uptake mechanisms can contribute to cardiovascular disease.

== Therapeutic uses ==
Inhibition of the norepinephrine transporter (NET) has potential therapeutic applications in the treatment of attention deficit hyperactivity disorder (ADHD), substance abuse, neurodegenerative disorders (e.g., Alzheimer's disease (AD) and Parkinson's disease (PD)) and clinical depression.

=== Major depressive disorder ===
Amineptine, an NDRI tricyclic antidepressant

Fluoxetine, a selective serotonin reuptake inhibitor

Certain antidepressant medications act to raise noradrenaline, such as serotonin-norepinephrine reuptake inhibitors (SNRIs), norepinephrine-dopamine reuptake inhibitors (NDRIs), norepinephrine reuptake inhibitors (NRIs or NERIs) and the tricyclic antidepressants (TCAs). The mechanism by which these medications work is that the reuptake inhibitors prevent the reuptake of serotonin and norepinephrine by the presynaptic neuron, paralyzing the normal function of the NET. At the same time, higher levels of 5-HT are maintained in the synapse increasing the concentrations of the latter neurotransmitters. Since the noradrenaline transporter is responsible for most of the dopamine clearance in the prefrontal cortex, SNRIs block reuptake of dopamine too, accumulating the dopamine in the synapse. However, DAT, the primary way dopamine is transported out of the cell, can work to decrease dopamine concentration in the synapse when the NET is blocked. For many years, the number one choice in treating mood disorders like depression was through administration of TCAs, such as desipramine (Norpramin), nortriptyline (Arentyl, Pamelor), protriptyline (Vivactil), and amoxapine (Asendin). SSRIs, which mainly regulate serotonin, subsequently replaced tricyclics as the primary treatment option for depression because of their better tolerability and lower incidence of adverse effects.

=== ADHD ===
Atomoxetine, an NET inhibitor marketed as Strattera

Many drugs exist in the treatment of ADHD. Dextroamphetamine (Dexedrine, Dextrostat), Adderall, methylphenidate (Ritalin, Metadate, Concerta, Daytrana), and lisdexamfetamine (Vyvanse) block reabsorption of the catecholamines dopamine and norepinephrine through monoamine transporters (including NET), thereby increasing levels of these neurotransmitters in the brain. The strong selective norepinephrine reuptake inhibitor (NRI), atomoxetine (Strattera), has been approved by the U.S. Food and Drug Administration (FDA) to treat ADHD in adults. The role of the NET in ADHD is similar to how it works to ease the symptoms of depression. The NET is blockaded by atomoxetine and increases NE levels in the brain. It can work to increase one's ability to focus, decrease any impulsiveness, and lessen hyperactivity in both children and adults with ADHD.

== Psychostimulants ==
=== Cocaine ===
Cocaine is a powerful psychostimulant and known to be one of the most widely used substances recreationally. Cocaine is a nonselective, reuptake inhibitor of the norepinephrine, serotonin, and dopamine transporters. This thwarts the absorption of these chemicals into the presynaptic terminal and allows a large concentration of dopamine, serotonin and norepinephrine to build up in the synaptic cleft. The potential for cocaine addiction is thought to be a result of its effects on dopamine transporters in the CNS, while it has been suggested that the life-threatening cardiovascular effects of cocaine may involve the inhibition of NETs at sympathetic and CNS autonomic synapses.

=== Amphetamines ===
The chemical structure of MDMA or "ecstasy"

Amphetamines have an effect on norepinephrine levels similar to that of cocaine in that they both increase NE levels in the brain. Amphetamine-like drugs are substrates for monoamine transporters, include NET, that cause a reversal in the direction of neurotransmitter transport. Amphetamines cause a large accumulation of extracellular NE. High levels of NE in the brain account for most of the profound effects of amphetamines, including alertness and anorectic, locomotor and sympathomimetic effects. However, the effects that amphetamines have on the brain are slower but last longer than the effects cocaine has on the brain. MDMA (3,4-Methylenedioxymethamphetamine or "ecstasy") is an amphetamine with wide recreational use. A study reported that the NET inhibitor reboxetine reduced the stimulant effects of MDMA in humans, demonstrating the crucial role NET has in the cardiovascular and stimulant-like effects of MDMA.

== Further research ==
The role of the NET in many brain disorders underlies the importance of understanding the (dys)regulation of the transporter. A complete model of the proteins that associate with the transporter will be useful in designing drug therapies for diseases such as schizophrenia, affective disorder, and autonomic disorders. Recently discovered mechanisms of the NET, including the ability to act reversibly and as an ion channel, provide other areas of research.

=== Schizophrenia ===
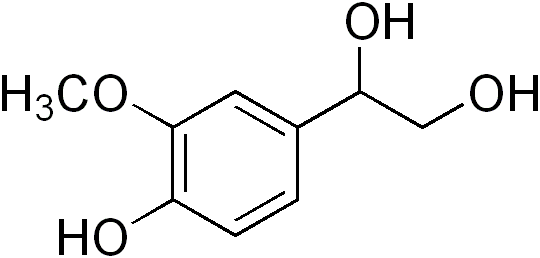
Chemical structure of 3-methoxy-4-hydroxyphenylglycol (MHPG), a metabolite of NE. Abnormally high levels of MHPG are also indicative of impaired NE regulation.

The role of NE in schizophrenia has not been fully understood, but has stimulated research into this topic. The only relationship that has been understood between researchers is that there is a positive correlation between increased NE levels in the brain and spinal fluid (CSF) and activity of schizophrenia. In one study, clonidine, a drug used to treat medical conditions such as ADHD and high blood pressure, was shown to produce a significant decrease in plasma level MHPG (3-methoxy-4-hydroxyphenylglycol), a metabolite of NE, in the normal control group, but not in the group of schizophrenic patients. This suggests that in schizophrenia, the alpha-2 adrenergic receptor, a presynaptic inhibitory receptor, may be less sensitive compared to normally functioning alpha-2 receptors and thus relate to elevated NE levels in the disorder. In addition to increased NE levels in the brain and CSF, increased levels of MHPG has also been associated with a diagnosis of schizophrenia. Impaired NE regulation in schizophrenia has been an area of interest for researchers and research on this topic is still ongoing.

== Imaging ==
Via positron emission tomography imaging technique, NET has been selectively investigated. 11C ME@HAPTHI and 18F-MeNER are two NET selective radio tracers for PET imaging. Fluorescent substrates for the transporter can also be used to monitor the transporter rate in isolated organs or tissues, although these are not suitable for clinical imaging.

== Ligands and modulators ==
=== Substrates ===
- Norepinephrine
- Substrate-type norepinephrine releasing agents (e.g., ephedrine, amphetamine)
- Catecholaminergic activity enhancers (e.g., selegiline, PPAP, BPAP)
- Certain noradrenergic neurotoxins (e.g., DSP-4, xylamine)

=== Norepinephrine reuptake inhibitors (NRIs) ===
==== Selective norepinephrine reuptake inhibitors ====
- Ampreloxetine
- Atomoxetine
- Nisoxetine
- Reboxetine
- Viloxazine

==== Norepinephrine–dopamine reuptake inhibitors (NDRIs) ====
- Amineptine
- Bupropion
- Desoxypipradrol
- Levophacetoperane
- Methylenedioxypyrovalerone (MDPV)
- Methylphenidate
- Nomifensine
- Pipradrol
- Serdexmethylphenidate
- Solriamfetol

==== Serotonin–norepinephrine reuptake inhibitors (SNRIs) ====
- Desvenlafaxine
- Duloxetine
- Levomilnacipran
- Milnacipran
- Sibutramine
- Venlafaxine

==== Non-selective norepinephrine reuptake inhibitors ====
- Amitriptyline
- Amoxapine
- Clomipramine
- Cocaine
- Desipramine
- Imipramine
- Indeloxazine
- Maprotiline
- Mazindol
- Mianserin
- Nortriptyline
- Protriptyline
- Setiptiline
- Tapentadol
- Teniloxazine
- Tramadol

=== Norepinephrine releasing agents (NRAs) ===
- Aminorex
- Amphetamine
- Benzylpiperazine
- Cathinone
- Ephedrine
- Lisdexamfetamine
- Mephedrone
- Methamphetamine
- Methylenedioxymethamphetamine (MDMA)
- Methylone
- Octopamine
- Phenethylamine
- Phenmetrazine
- Phentermine
- Phenylpropanolamine
- Pseudoephedrine
- Tyramine

== See also ==
- Neurotransmitter transporter
- Sodium:neurotransmitter symporter
- Solute carrier family
- Norepinephrine
- Monoamine transporter
- Orthostatic intolerance
- Single-nucleotide polymorphisms
