= Mianserin =

Antidepressant

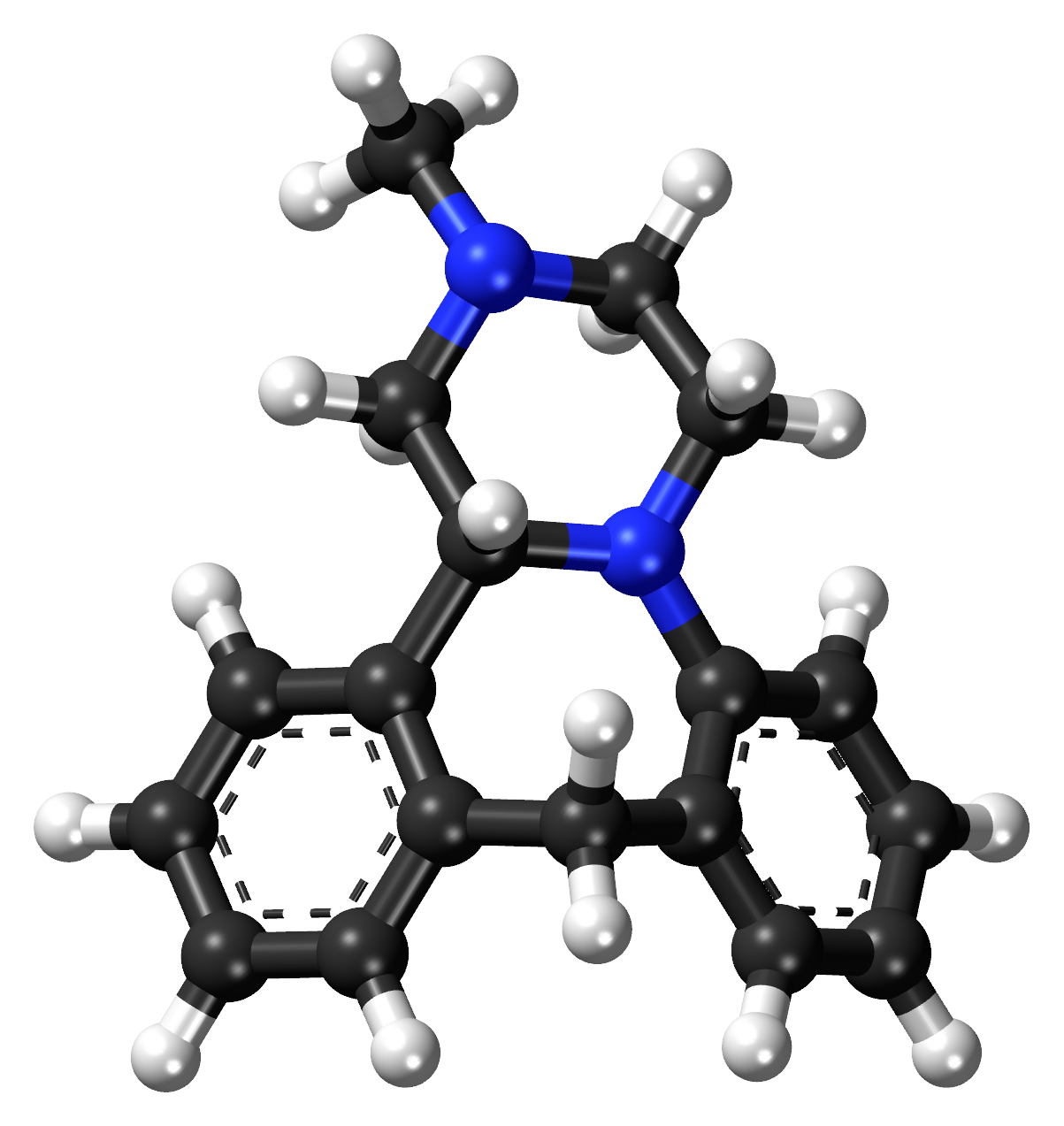

Clinical data
- Trade names: Tolvon, others
- Other names: Mianserin hydrochloride; Org GB 94
- Pregnancy category: AU: B2
- Routes of administration: By mouth
- Drug class: Phenylpiperazine; tetracyclic antidepressant; atypical antidepressant; noradrenergic and specific serotonergic antidepressant (NaSSA)
- ATC code: N06AX03 (WHO)

Legal status
- Legal status: AU: S4 (Prescription only); BR: Class C1 (Other controlled substances); UK: POM (Prescription only)

Pharmacokinetic data
- Bioavailability: 20–30%
- Protein binding: 95%
- Metabolism: Liver (CYP2D6; via aromatic hydroxylation, N-oxidation, N-demethylation)
- Elimination half-life: 21–61 hours
- Excretion: Urine: 4–7% Feces: 14–28%

Identifiers
- IUPAC name: (±)-2-methyl-1,2,3,4,10,14b-hexahydrodibenzo[c,f]pyrazino[1,2-a]azepine
- CAS Number: 24219-97-4 21535-47-7 (hydrochloride) 51152-88-6 ((S)-isomer)
- PubChem CID: 4184
- IUPHAR/BPS: 135
- DrugBank: DB06148
- ChemSpider: 4040
- UNII: 250PJI13LM
- KEGG: D08216
- ChEBI: CHEBI:51137
- ChEMBL: ChEMBL6437
- CompTox Dashboard (EPA): DTXSID6023317
- ECHA InfoCard: 100.041.884

Chemical and physical data
- Formula: C_{18}H_{20}N_{2}
- Molar mass: 264.372 g·mol^{−1}
- 3D model (JSmol): Interactive image
- SMILES: c42c(N3C(c1ccccc1C2)CN(C)CC3)cccc4
- InChI: InChI=1S/C18H20N2/c1-19-10-11-20-17-9-5-3-7-15(17)12-14-6-2-4-8-16(14)18(20)13-19/h2-9,18H,10-13H2,1H3; Key:UEQUQVLFIPOEMF-UHFFFAOYSA-N

Mianserin, sold as Tolvon and other brand names, is an atypical antidepressant used primarily for treating depression in Europe and other territories. It is a tetracyclic antidepressant (TeCA) and is closely related to mirtazapine in terms of chemical structure, actions, and effects, although mianserin has greater noradrenergic activity and less 5-HT3 receptor antagonism.

== Medical uses ==
Mianserin is used at higher doses (30–90 mg/day) for the treatment of major depressive disorder. At lower doses (around 10 mg/day), it is used to treat insomnia.

== Contraindications ==
It should not be given, except if based on clinical need and under strict medical supervision, to people younger than 18 years old, as it can increase the risk of suicide attempts and suicidal thinking, and it can increase aggressiveness.

While there is no evidence that it can harm a fetus from animal models, there is no data showing it safe for pregnant women to take.

People with severe liver disease should not take mianserin, and it should be used with caution for people with epilepsy or who are at risk for seizures, as it can lower the threshold for seizures. If based on clinical decision, normal precautions should be exercised and the dosages of mianserin and any concurrent therapy kept under review and adjusted as needed.

== Side effects ==
Very common (incidence > 10%) adverse effects include constipation, dry mouth, and drowsiness at the beginning of treatment.

Common (1% < incidence ≤ 10%) adverse effects include drowsiness during maintenance therapy, tremor, headache, dizziness, vertigo, and weakness.

Uncommon (0.1% < incidence ≤ 1%) adverse effects include weight gain.

=== Withdrawal ===
Abrupt or rapid discontinuation of mianserin may provoke a withdrawal, the effects of which may include depression, anxiety, panic attacks, decreased appetite or anorexia, insomnia, diarrhea, nausea and vomiting, and flu-like symptoms, such as allergies or pruritus, among others.

== Overdose ==
Overdose of mianserin is known to produce sedation, coma, hypotension or hypertension, tachycardia, and QT interval prolongation.

== Interactions ==
Mianserin may enhance the sedative effects of drugs such as alcohol, anxiolytics, hypnotics, or antipsychotics when co-administered. It may decrease the efficacy of antiepileptic medications.

Carbamazepine and phenobarbital will cause the body to metabolize mianserin faster and may reduce its effects. There is a risk of dangerously low blood pressure if people take mianserin along with diazoxide, hydralazine, or nitroprusside. Mianserin can make antihistamines and antimuscarinics have stronger effects. Mianserin should not be taken with apraclonidine, brimonidine, sibutramine, or the combination drug of artemether with lumefantrine.

== Pharmacology ==
=== Pharmacodynamics ===
Mianserin
Site	K_{i} (nM)	Species	Ref
SERT	4000	Human	
NET	71	Human	
DAT	9400	Human	
5-HT_{1A}	400–2600	Human	
5-HT_{1B}	2800–4700	Rat	
5-HT_{1D}	220–400	Human	
5-HT_{1E}	ND	ND	ND
5-HT_{1F}	13	Human	
5-HT_{2A}	1.6–55	Human	
5-HT_{2B}	1.6–20	Human	
5-HT_{2C}	0.63–6.5	Human	
5-HT_{3}	5.8–300	Rodent	
5-HT_{4}	ND	ND	ND
5-HT_{5A}	ND	ND	ND
5-HT_{6}	55–81	Human	
5-HT_{7}	48–56	Human	
α_{1}	34	Human	
α_{2}	73	Human	
α_{2A}	4.8	Human	
α_{2B}	27	Human	
α_{2C}	3.8	Human	
D_{1}	426–1420	Human	
D_{2}	2100–2700	Human	
D_{3}	2840	Human	
D_{4}	ND	ND	ND
D_{5}	ND	ND	ND
H_{1}	0.30–1.7	Human	
H_{2}	437	Human	
H_{3}	95500	Human	
H_{4}	100000+	Human	
mACh	820	Human	
MOR	21000	Human	
DOR	30200	Human	
KOR	530 (EC_{50})	Human	
Values are K_{i} (nM), unless otherwise noted. The smaller the value, the more strongly the drug binds to the site.

Mianserin appears to exert its effects via antagonism of histamine and serotonin receptors, and inhibition of norepinephrine reuptake. More specifically, it is an antagonist/inverse agonist at most, if not all sites of the histamine H_{1} receptor, serotonin 5-HT_{1D}, 5-HT_{1F}, 5-HT_{2A}, 5-HT_{2B}, 5-HT_{2C}, 5-HT_{3}, 5-HT_{6}, and 5-HT_{7} receptors, and adrenergic α_{1}- and α_{2}-adrenergic receptors, and additionally a norepinephrine reuptake inhibitor. As an H_{1} receptor inverse agonist with high affinity, mianserin has strong antihistamine effects (e.g., sedation). Conversely, it has low affinity for the muscarinic acetylcholine receptors, and hence lacks anticholinergic properties. Mianserin has been found to be a low affinity but potentially significant partial agonist of the κ-opioid receptor (K_{i} = 1.7 μM; EC_{50} = 0.53 μM), similarly to some tricyclic antidepressants (TCAs).

Blockade of the H_{1} and possibly α_{1}-adrenergic receptors has sedative effects, and also antagonism of the 5-HT_{2A} and α_{1}-adrenergic receptors inhibits activation of intracellular phospholipase C (PLC), which seems to be a common target for several different classes of antidepressants. By antagonizing the somatodendritic and presynaptic α_{2}-adrenergic receptors, which function predominantly as inhibitory autoreceptors and heteroreceptors, mianserin disinhibits the release of norepinephrine, dopamine, serotonin, and acetylcholine in various areas of the brain and body.

Along with mirtazapine, although to a lesser extent in comparison, mianserin has sometimes been described as a noradrenergic and specific serotonergic antidepressant (NaSSA). However, the actual evidence in support of this label has been regarded as poor.

=== Pharmacokinetics ===
The bioavailability of mianserin is 20 to 30%. Its plasma protein binding is 95%. Mianserin is metabolized in the liver by the CYP2D6 enzyme via N-oxidation and N-demethylation. Its elimination half-life is 21 to 61 hours. The drug is excreted 4 to 7% in the urine and 14 to 28% in feces.

== Chemistry ==
(S)-Mianserin.

Mianserin is a tetracyclic piperazinoazepine. Mirtazapine was developed by the same team of organic chemists and differs via addition of a nitrogen atom in one of the rings. (S)-(+)-Mianserin is approximately 200–300 times more active than its enantiomer (R)-(−)-mianserin; hence, the activity of mianserin lies in the (S)-(+) isomer.

== History ==
It was developed but not discovered by Organon International; the first patents were issued in The Netherlands in 1967, and it was launched in West Germany in 1975 , in France in 1979 under the brand name Athymil, and in the UK as Norval. Investigators conducting clinical trials in the US submitted fraudulent data, and it was never approved in the US.

Mianserin was one of the first antidepressants to reach the UK market that was less dangerous than the tricyclic antidepressants in overdose; as of 2012 it was not prescribed much in the UK.

== Society and culture ==
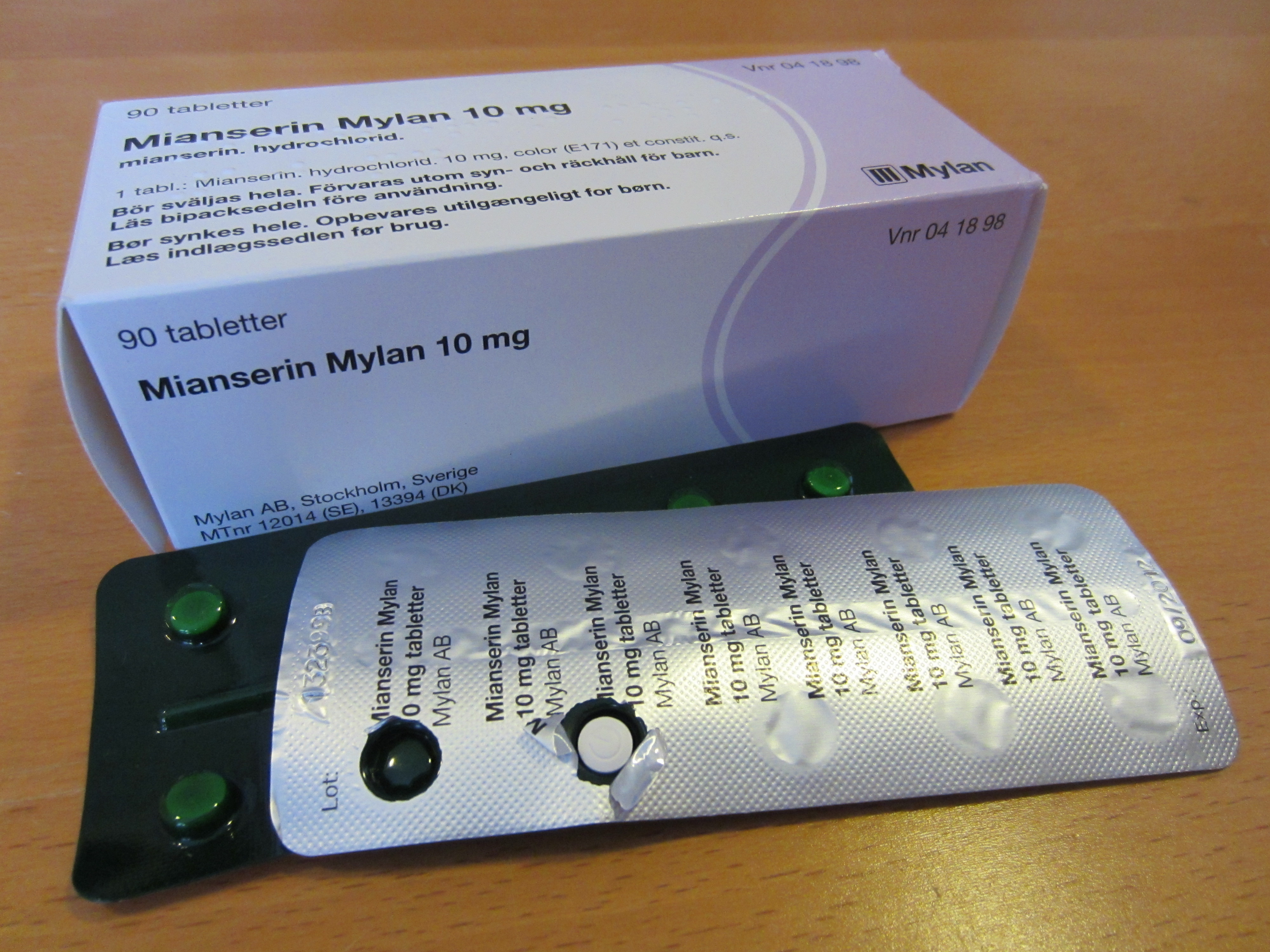
Mianserin.

=== Generic names ===
Mianserin is the English and German generic name of the drug and its INN and BAN, while mianserin hydrochloride is its USAN, BANM, and JAN. Its generic name in French and its DCF are miansérine, in Spanish and Italian and its DCIT are mianserina, and in Latin is mianserinum.

=== Brand names ===
Mianserin is marketed in many countries mainly under the brand name Tolvon. It is also available throughout the world under a variety of other brand names including Athymil, Bonserin, Bolvidon, Deprevon, Lantanon, Lerivon, Lumin, Miansan, Serelan, Tetramide, and Tolvin among others.

=== Availability ===
Mianserin is not approved for use in the United States, but is available in the United Kingdom and other European countries. A mianserin generic drug received TGA approval in May 1996 and is available in Australia.

== Research ==
The use of mianserin to help people with schizophrenia who are being treated with antipsychotics has been studied in clinical trials; the outcome is unclear.
