= Heteroreceptor =

Biochemical receptor

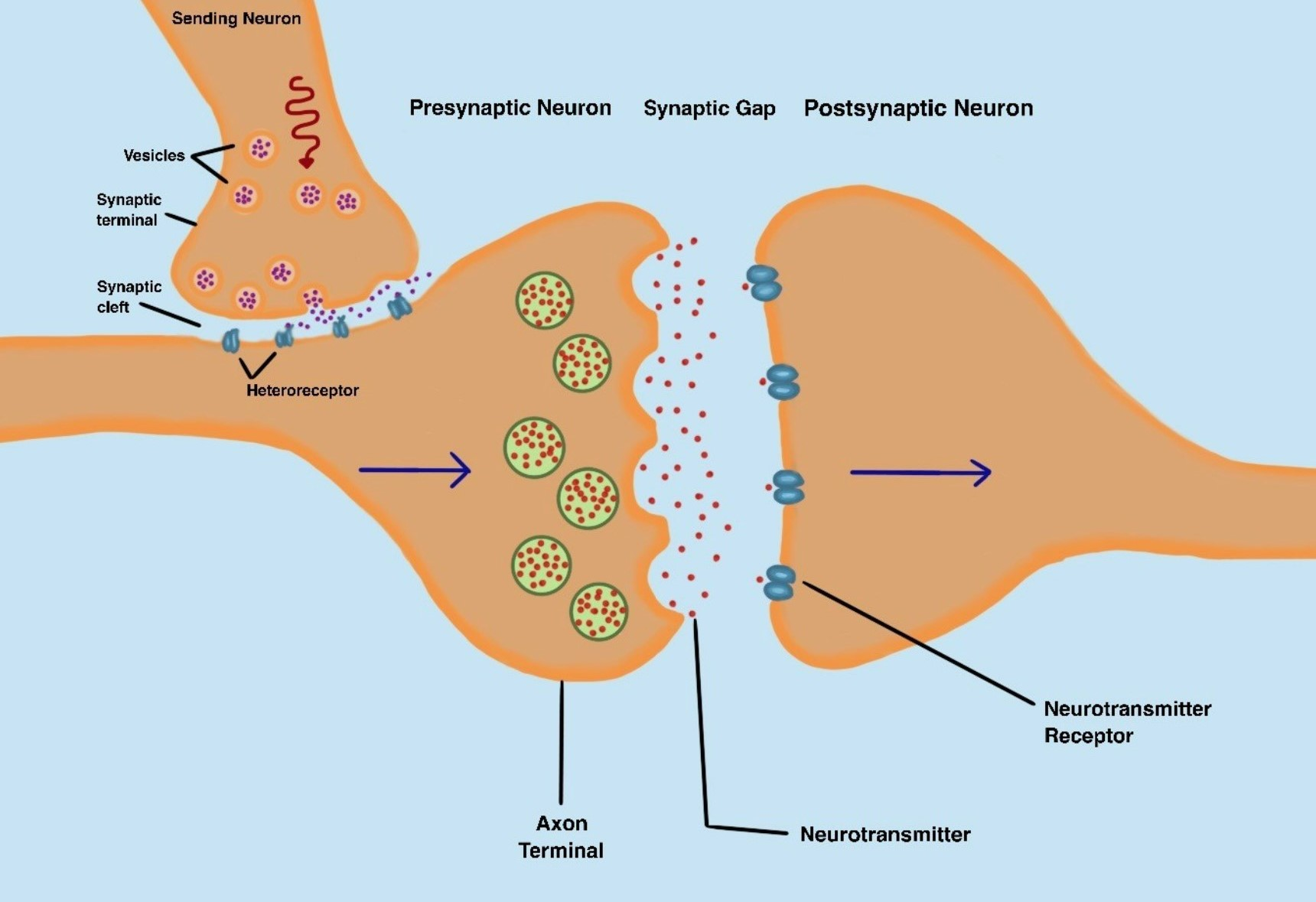
A generalized neuron containing heteroreceptors showing the release of different neurotransmitters than the heteroreceptor ligand.

A heteroreceptor is a receptor located in the cell membrane of a neuron, regulating the synthesis and/or the release of mediators other than its own ligand. Heteroreceptors play a crucial role in modulating neurotransmitter systems and are often targets for therapeutic drugs. By influencing the activity of other neurotransmitters, the receptors contribute to the complex regulation of neural communication and have been implicated in various physiological and pathological processes.

Heteroreceptors may be located in any part of the Neuron including the dendrites, the cell body, the axon, or the axon terminals.

Heteroreceptors respond to neurotransmitters, neuromodulators, or neurohormones released from adjacent neurons or cells; they are opposite to autoreceptors, which are sensitive only to neurotransmitters or hormones released by the cell in whose wall they are embedded.

== Examples ==
- Norepinephrine can influence the release of acetylcholine from parasympathetic neurons by acting on α2 adrenergic (α_{2A}, α_{2B}, and α_{2C}) heteroreceptors. These effects are related to analgesia, sedation, hypothermia.
- Acetylcholine can influence the release of norepinephrine from sympathetic neurons by acting on muscarinic-2 and muscarinic-4 heteroreceptors.
- CB1 negatively modulates the release of GABA and glutamate, playing a crucial role in maintaining a homeostasis between excitatory and inhibitory transmission.
- Glutamate released from an excitatory neuron escapes from the synaptic cleft and preferentially affects mGluR III receptors on the presynaptic terminals of interneurons. Glutamate spillover leads to inhibition of GABA release, modulating GABAergic transmission.

== See also ==
- Autoreceptor
