= Autoreceptor =

Type of receptor located in the membranes of nerve cells

An autoreceptor is a type of receptor located in the membranes of nerve cells. It serves as part of a negative feedback loop in signal transduction. It is only sensitive to the neurotransmitters or hormones released by the neuron on which the autoreceptor sits. Similarly, a heteroreceptor is sensitive to neurotransmitters and hormones that are not released by the cell on which it sits. A given receptor can act as either an autoreceptor or a heteroreceptor, depending upon the type of transmitter released by the cell on which it is embedded.

Autoreceptors may be located in any part of the cell membrane: in the dendrites, the cell body, the axon, or the axon terminals.

Canonically, a presynaptic neuron releases a neurotransmitter across a synaptic cleft to be detected by the receptors on a postsynaptic neuron. Autoreceptors on the presynaptic neuron will also detect this neurotransmitter and often function to control internal cell processes, typically inhibiting further release or synthesis of the neurotransmitter. Thus, release of neurotransmitter is regulated by negative feedback. Autoreceptors are usually G protein-coupled receptors (rather than transmitter-gated ion channels) and act via a second messenger.

== Examples ==
Autoreceptor inhibition increases respective neurotransmitter release. Clinically important autoreceptors include alpha 2(adrenergic receptor subtype 2), H 3(histamine receptor subtype 3), and 5 HT 1(serotonin receptor subtype 1). Clonidine, used in treatment of hypertension, acts as an agonist on alpha 2, which reduces release of norepinephrine and epinephrine from presynaptic neurons. Tizanidine, used as a centrally-acting skeletal muscle relaxant, also acts on alpha 2. 5 HT 1A is a target of Buspirone, which acts as a partial Agonist and is used as Atypical non-sedative anxiolytic. 5HT 1B/1D receptor Agonist are Triptans and Ergot alkaloids which are used in treatment of migraines. 5 HT 1F receptor subtype Agonist drug lesmiditan is also used in treatment of migraine. The H 3 receptor antagonist Pitolisant is used in narcolepsy. As an example, norepinephrine released from sympathetic neurons may interact with the alpha-2A and alpha-2C adrenoreceptors to inhibit further release of norepinephrine. Similarly, acetylcholine released from parasympathetic neurons may interact with M_{2} and M_{4} receptors to inhibit further release of acetylcholine. An atypical example is given by the β-adrenergic autoreceptor in the sympathetic peripheral nervous system, which acts to increase transmitter release.

The D2 autoreceptor has been shown recently to interact with the trace amine-associated receptor 1 (TAAR1), a G-Coupled Protein Receptor GPCR, to regulate monoaminergic systems in the brain. Active TAAR1 opposes the autoreceptor's activity by inactivating the dopamine transporter (DAT). In their review of TAAR1 in monoaminergic systems, Xie and Miller proposed this schematic: synaptic dopamine binds to the dopamine autoreceptor, which activates the DAT. Dopamine enters the presynaptic cells and binds to TAAR1, which increases adenylyl cyclase activity. This eventually allows for the translation of trace amines in the cytoplasm and activation of cyclic nucleotide-gated ion channels, which further activate TAAR1 and dump dopamine into the synapse. Through a series of phosphorylation events related to PKA and PKC, active TAAR1 inactivates DAT, preventing uptake of dopamine from the synapse. The presence of two Postsynaptic receptors with opposite abilities to regulate monoamine transporter function allows for regulation of the monoaminergic system.

Autoreceptor activity may also decrease paired-pulse facilitation (PPF). A feedback cell is activated by the (partially) depolarized post-synaptic neuron. The feedback cell releases a neurotransmitter to which the autoreceptor of the presynaptic neuron is receptive. The autoreceptor causes the inhibition of calcium channels (slowing calcium ion influx) and the opening of potassium channels (increasing potassium ion efflux) in the presynaptic membrane. These changes in ion concentration effectively diminish the amount of the original neurotransmitter released by the presynaptic terminal into the synaptic cleft. This causes a final depression on the activity of the postsynaptic neuron. Thus the feedback cycle is complete.

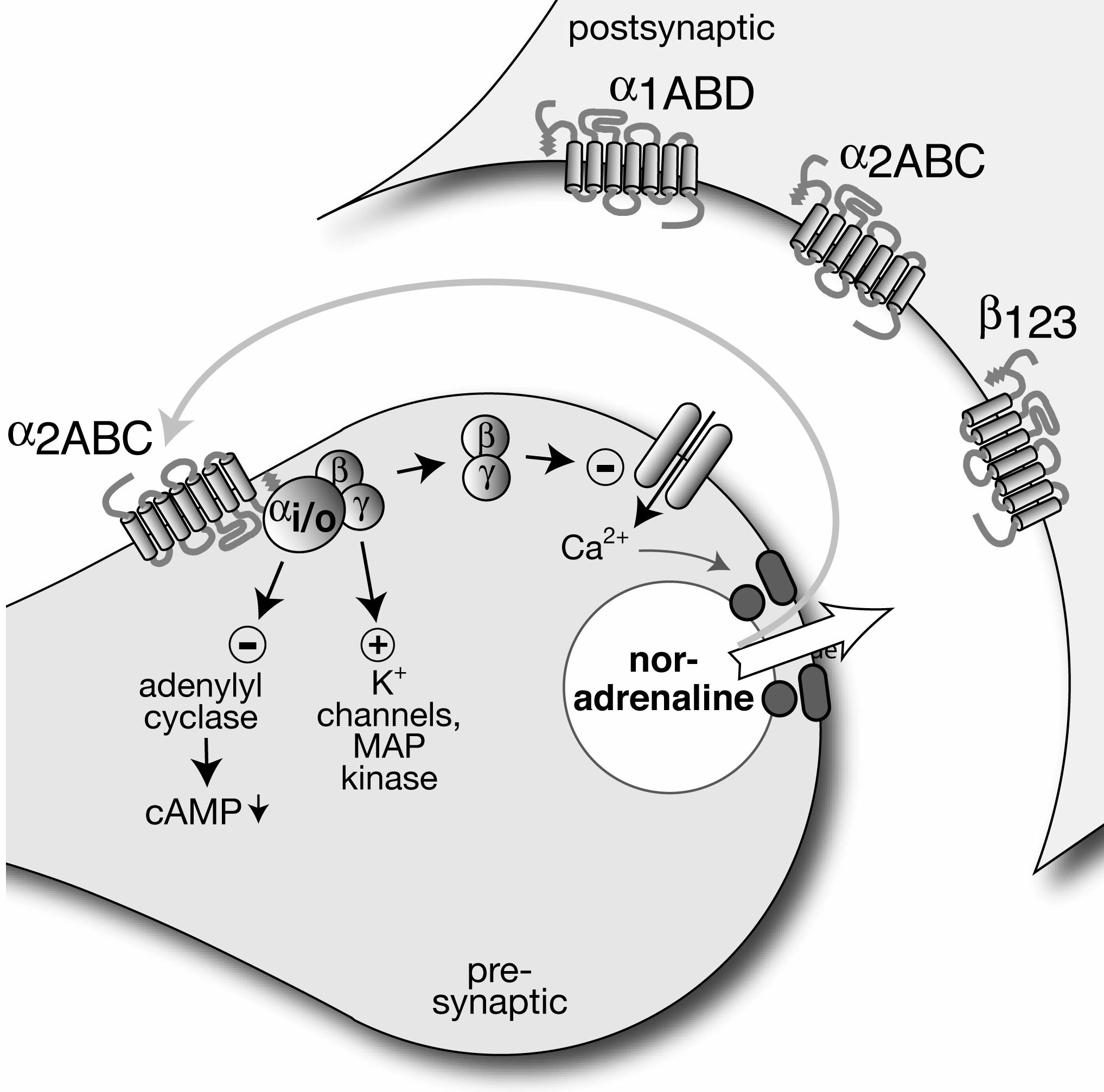
This diagram shows pre-synaptic neuron (left) releasing a neurotransmitter, noradrenaline (norepinephrine), into the synaptic cleft. The transmitter acts on the receptors of the post-synaptic neuron (right), but also on autoreceptors of the pre-synaptic neuron. Activation of these autoreceptors typically inhibits further release of the neurotransmitter.

Amphetamine, trace amines, and dopamine can activate TAAR1 in dopamine neurons, but only dopamine activates D2sh. These receptors have opposite effects on protein kinase signaling. This results in opposite effects on DAT phosporylation, and consequently, on reuptake as well.
