= Adrenergic release inhibitor =

Class of antihypertensive drugs

Guanethidine, an adrenergic release inhibitor.

Adrenergic release inhibitors are a class of drugs which inhibit the release of epinephrine (adrenaline) and/or norepinephrine (noradrenaline) from adrenergic nerve terminals and are used as antihypertensives. Examples of these agents include bethanidine, bretylium, debrisoquine, guanisoquin(7-bromo Debrisoquine), guanadrel, guanazodine, guancydine, guanethidine, guanoclor, and guanoxan. Most agents of this class are guanidinium compounds and have little capacity to cross the blood–brain barrier.
