= Tolonidine =

Names
- Preferred IUPAC name N-(2-Chloro-4-methylphenyl)-4,5-dihydro-1H-imidazol-2-amine

Identifiers
CAS Number	4201-22-3
3D model (JSmol)	Interactive image
ChemSpider	65112
KEGG	D07168
PubChem CID	72138
UNII	I4O795Q03O
CompTox Dashboard (EPA)	DTXSID80194815
- InChI: InChI=1S/C10H12ClN3/c1-7-2-3-9(8(11)6-7)14-10-12-4-5-13-10/h2-3,6H,4-5H2,1H3,(H2,12,13,14) Key: KWBTZIFLQYYPTH-UHFFFAOYSA-N; InChI=1/C10H12ClN3/c1-7-2-3-9(8(11)6-7)14-10-12-4-5-13-10/h2-3,6H,4-5H2,1H3,(H2,12,13,14) Key: KWBTZIFLQYYPTH-UHFFFAOYAF
- SMILES: Clc1cc(C)ccc1NC2=NCCN2

Properties
Chemical formula	C_{10}H_{12}ClN_{3}
Molar mass	209.67538

Pharmacology
ATC code	C02AC04 (WHO)
- Except where otherwise noted, data are given for materials in their standard state (at 25 °C [77 °F], 100 kPa). verify (what is ?) Infobox references

Tolonidine is an antihypertensive. It is an imidazoline receptor agonist, like moxonidine and rilmenidine.

== See also ==
- Clonidine
