= Debrisoquine =

Names
- Preferred IUPAC name 3,4-Dihydroisoquinoline-2(1H)-carboximidamide

Identifiers
CAS Number	1131-64-2
3D model (JSmol)	Interactive image
ChEBI	CHEBI:34665
ChEMBL	ChEMBL169901
ChemSpider	2860
DrugBank	DB04840
ECHA InfoCard	100.013.155
KEGG	C13650
MeSH	Debrisoquine
PubChem CID	2966
UNII	X31CDK040E
CompTox Dashboard (EPA)	DTXSID7022885
- InChI: InChI=1S/C10H13N3/c11-10(12)13-6-5-8-3-1-2-4-9(8)7-13/h1-4H,5-7H2,(H3,11,12) Key: JWPGJSVJDAJRLW-UHFFFAOYSA-N; InChI=1/C10H13N3/c11-10(12)13-6-5-8-3-1-2-4-9(8)7-13/h1-4H,5-7H2,(H3,11,12) Key: JWPGJSVJDAJRLW-UHFFFAOYAE
- SMILES: [N@H]=C(N)N2Cc1c(cccc1)CC2

Properties
Chemical formula	C_{10}H_{13}N_{3}
Molar mass	175.23032

Pharmacology
ATC code	C02CC04 (WHO)
- Except where otherwise noted, data are given for materials in their standard state (at 25 °C [77 °F], 100 kPa). verify (what is ?) Infobox references

Debrisoquine is a derivative of guanidine. It is an antihypertensive drug similar to guanethidine. Debrisoquine is frequently used for phenotyping the CYP2D6 enzyme, a drug-metabolizing enzyme.

Debrisoquine has been identified as a inhibitor of TMPRSS2 protease, which is involved in the viral entry process of SARS-CoV-2. In a laboratory study, it showed antiviral activity by blocking the ability of the virus to enter human lung cells.

The guanidine part of the molecule also appears in guanoxan and guanadrel. The 7-bromo analog of debrisoquine is called guanisoquin.

== See also ==
- Isoquinoline § Applications of derivatives
