= Trimazosin =

Chemical compound

Clinical data
- ATC code: C02CA03 (WHO)

Identifiers
- IUPAC name: (2-Hydroxy-2-methylpropyl) 4-(4-amino-6,7,8-trimethoxyquinazolin-2-yl)piperazine-1-carboxylate
- CAS Number: 35795-16-5; HCl: 53746-46-6
- PubChem CID: 37264
- ChemSpider: 34203
- UNII: 31L760807H; HCl: 827T79ILE7
- KEGG: D08212
- ChEMBL: ChEMBL513301
- CompTox Dashboard (EPA): DTXSID50189319
- ECHA InfoCard: 100.047.924

Chemical and physical data
- Formula: C_{20}H_{29}N_{5}O_{6}
- Molar mass: 435.481 g·mol^{−1}
- 3D model (JSmol): Interactive image
- SMILES: O=C(OCC(O)(C)C)N3CCN(c1nc(N)c2c(n1)c(OC)c(OC)c(OC)c2)CC3
- InChI: InChI=1S/C20H29N5O6/c1-20(2,27)11-31-19(26)25-8-6-24(7-9-25)18-22-14-12(17(21)23-18)10-13(28-3)15(29-4)16(14)30-5/h10,27H,6-9,11H2,1-5H3,(H2,21,22,23); Key:YNZXWQJZEDLQEG-UHFFFAOYSA-N

Trimazosin is a sympatholytic alpha-1 blocker.
