= C12H21N5O3 =

The molecular formula C_{12}H_{21}N_{5}O_{3} (molar mass: 283.33 g/mol, exact mass: 283.1644 u) may refer to:

- Cadralazine
- Choline theophyllinate, also known as oxtriphylline
