= C20H29N5O3 =

The molecular formula C_{20}H_{29}N_{5}O_{3} (molar mass: 387.47 g/mol, exact mass: 387.2270 u) may refer to:

- Urapidil
