= C33H40N2O9 =

The molecular formula C_{33}H_{40}N_{2}O_{9} (molar mass: 608.67 g/mol, exact mass: 608.2734 u) may refer to:

- Methoserpidine
- Reserpine
