= Hydrazinophthalazine =

Drug class

- Drug class
- Hydralazine

Class identifiers
- ATC code: C02DB
- Mode of action: Smooth muscle relaxant
- Mechanism of action: inhibition of intracellular calcium release

Legal status

Hydrazinophthalazines are a class of antihypertensive drugs characterized by a phthalazine ring system with a hydrazine group attached. The most notable member of this class is hydralazine, a medication used to treat high blood pressure and heart failure. Hydrazinophthalazines act as direct-acting smooth muscle relaxants, primarily affecting resistance arterioles to cause vasodilation. This pharmacological action results in decreased peripheral resistance and lowered blood pressure. While hydralazine is the most well-known compound in this class, other related drugs such as dihydralazine also belong to the hydrazinophthalazine family and exhibit similar antihypertensive properties. These compounds have been in clinical use since the mid-20th century, with hydralazine being discovered in the 1940s and approved by the FDA in 1953.

Examples include:

- Hydralazine
- Dihydralazine
- Cadralazine
- Endralazine

Chemically, the latter two are not phthalazines; but they are classified as such in the World Health Organization's Anatomical Therapeutic Chemical Classification System.
