= Penicillium smithii =

Scientific classification
- Domain: Eukaryota
- Kingdom: Fungi
- Division: Ascomycota
- Class: Eurotiomycetes
- Order: Eurotiales
- Family: Aspergillaceae
- Genus: Penicillium
- Species: P. smithii

Binomial name
- Penicillium smithii Quintanilla, J.A. 1982

Type strain
- CBS 276.83, CECT 2744, FRR 2919, IMI 259693, Quintanilla 1097

Species of fungus

Penicillium smithii is a species of fungus in the genus Penicillium which produces citreoviridin and canescin Penicillium smithii occurs in soil in Canada and Europe
