= Dihydralazine =

Chemical compound

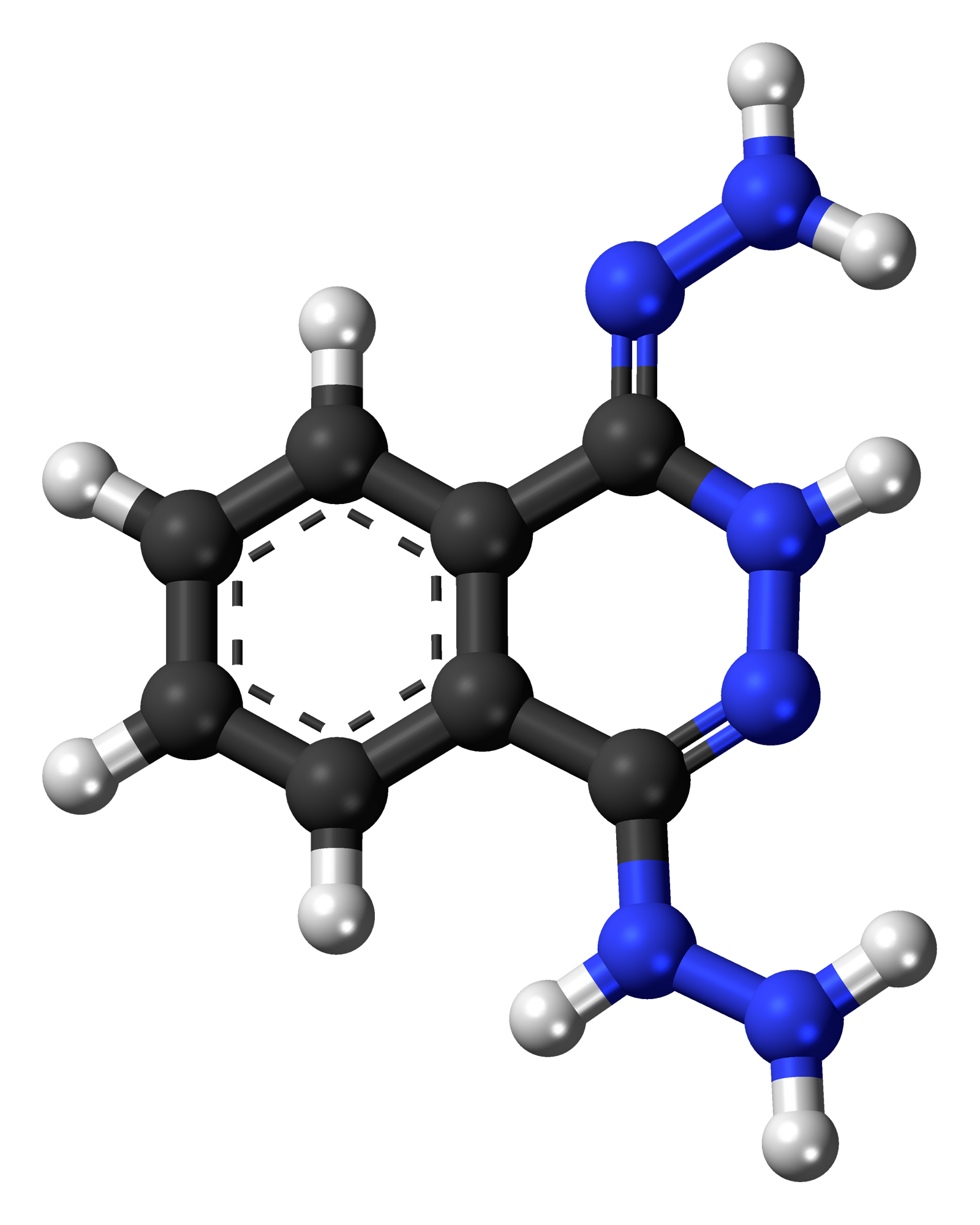

Clinical data
- AHFS/Drugs.com: International Drug Names
- ATC code: C02DB01 (WHO)

Identifiers
- IUPAC name: 4-Hydrazinyl-1-hydrazinylidene-1,2-dihydrophthalazine
- CAS Number: 484-23-1
- PubChem CID: 10230
- ChemSpider: 9813
- UNII: PCU411F5L6
- KEGG: D07170
- ChEMBL: ChEMBL35505
- CompTox Dashboard (EPA): DTXSID0022935
- ECHA InfoCard: 100.006.914

Chemical and physical data
- Formula: C_{8}H_{10}N_{6}
- Molar mass: 190.210 g·mol^{−1}
- 3D model (JSmol): Interactive image
- SMILES: NNc1c2ccccc2C(=NN)Nn1
- InChI: InChI=1S/C8H10N6/c9-11-7-5-3-1-2-4-6(5)8(12-10)14-13-7/h1-4H,9-10H2,(H,11,13)(H,12,14); Key:VQKLRVZQQYVIJW-UHFFFAOYSA-N

Dihydralazine is a prescription drug with antihypertensive properties. It functions by combating the effects of adrenaline, and by expanding the blood vessels so as to enable smoother flow of blood by decreasing the pressure. It is generally administered orally, and is available in the form of tablets. It belongs to the hydrazinophthalazine chemical class. It has very similar effects to hydralazine.

== Side effects ==
- Headache
- Loss of appetite
- Nausea
- Vomiting
- Diarrhea
- Palpitations
- Increased heart rate
- Angina pectoris

== Contraindications ==
Contraindications to this drug include allergic reactions to this drug or to any of its components, ischemic heart diseases, coronary artery diseases, valvular stenosis, aortic aneurysms and pericarditis. Patients who have a previous medical history of kidney dysfunctions, liver damage, heart disorders and cerebro-vascular disorders must exercise caution while taking this medicine. Dihydralazine must not be prescribed to patients who are elderly, or to breastfeeding women. Caution must be exercised while prescribing this medicine to pregnant women.

== Other important information on intake ==
When ending intake, it is recommended to withdraw gradually from this medicine, as opposed to abruptly ceasing its intake. Heartbeat problems and edema may occur as adverse effects.

== See also ==
- Hydralazine
