= Endralazine =

Chemical compound

Clinical data
- ATC code: C02DB03 (WHO)

Identifiers
- IUPAC name: 6-benzoyl-3-hydrazinyl-5H,6H,7H,8H-pyrido[4,3-c]pyridazine
- CAS Number: 39715-02-1
- PubChem CID: 47608
- ChemSpider: 43316
- UNII: L44741F05P
- KEGG: D08254
- ChEMBL: ChEMBL254193
- CompTox Dashboard (EPA): DTXSID40192791

Chemical and physical data
- Formula: C_{14}H_{15}N_{5}O
- Molar mass: 269.308 g·mol^{−1}
- 3D model (JSmol): Interactive image
- SMILES: c1ccc(cc1)C(=O)N2CCc3c(c/c(=N/N)/[nH]n3)C2
- InChI: InChI=1S/C14H15N5O/c15-16-13-8-11-9-19(7-6-12(11)17-18-13)14(20)10-4-2-1-3-5-10/h1-5,8H,6-7,9,15H2,(H,16,18); Key:ALAXZYHFVBSJKZ-UHFFFAOYSA-N

Endralazine is an antihypertensive of the hydrazinophthalazine chemical class. It is not approved for use in the United States.
