= Guanazodine =

Chemical compound

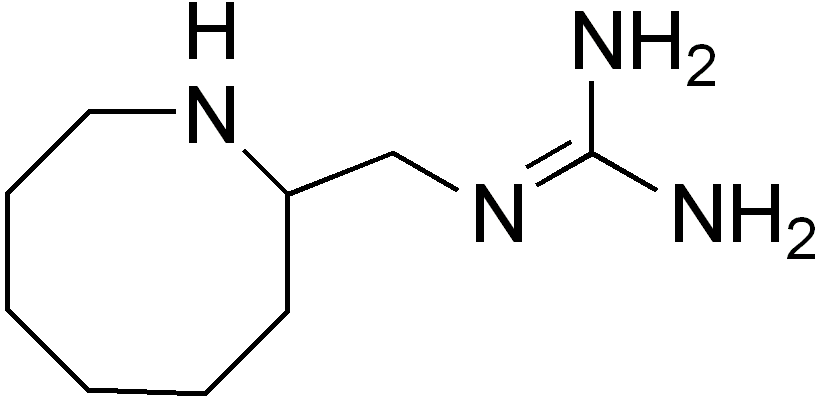

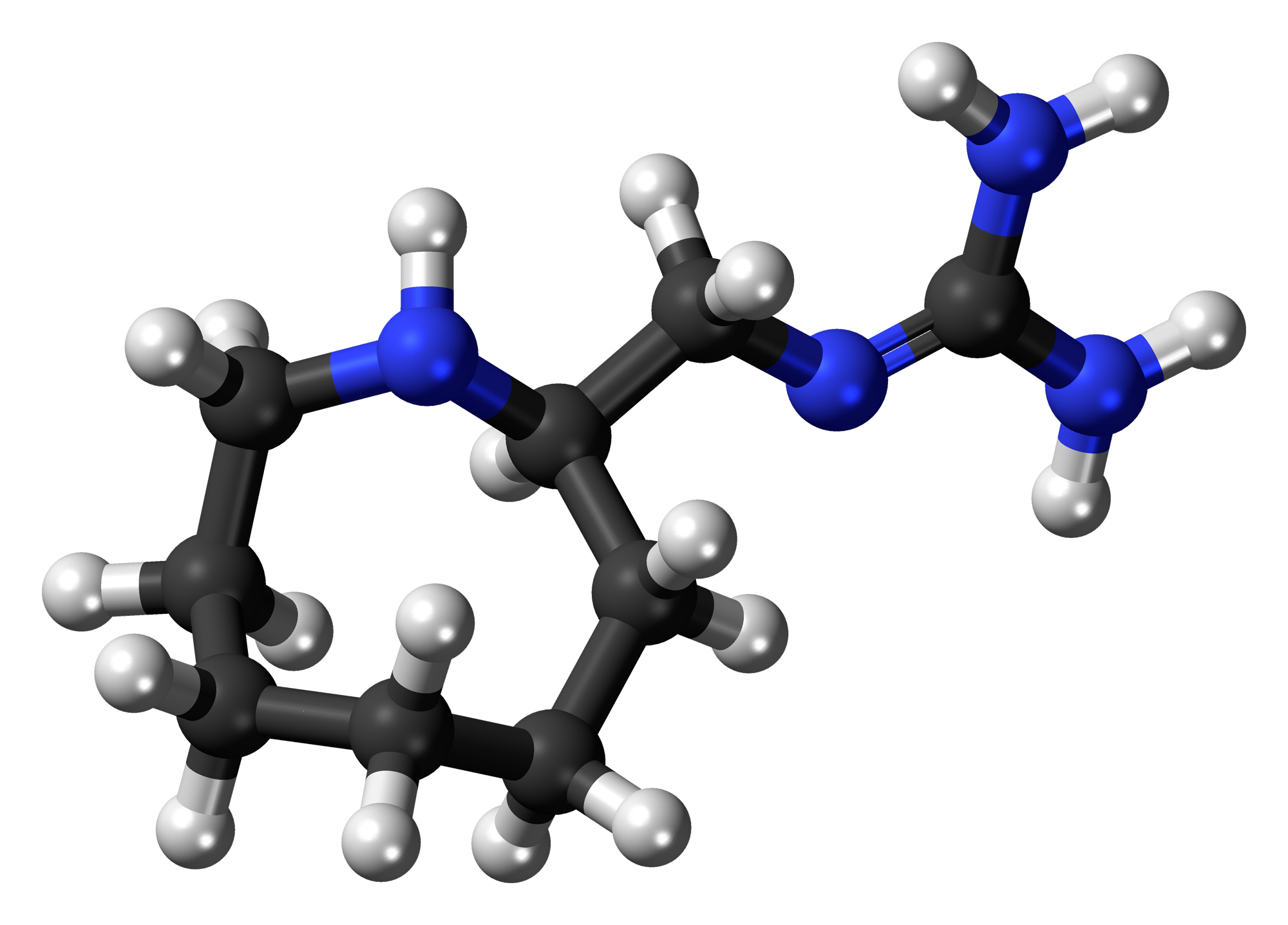

Clinical data
- ATC code: C02CC06 (WHO)

Identifiers
- IUPAC name: 2-(Azocan-2-ylmethyl)guanidine
- CAS Number: 32059-15-7
- PubChem CID: 36054
- ChemSpider: 33166
- UNII: 7N05KQ38YI
- KEGG: D07169
- ChEMBL: ChEMBL2008565
- CompTox Dashboard (EPA): DTXSID30953934

Chemical and physical data
- Formula: C_{9}H_{20}N_{4}
- Molar mass: 184.287 g·mol^{−1}
- 3D model (JSmol): Interactive image
- SMILES: C1CCCNC(CC1)CNC(=N)N
- InChI: InChI=1S/C9H20N4/c10-9(11)13-7-8-5-3-1-2-4-6-12-8/h8,12H,1-7H2,(H4,10,11,13); Key:ZCVAIGPGEINFCX-UHFFFAOYSA-N

Guanazodine is an anti-hypertensive sympatholytic drug.
