= Syrosingopine =

Chemical compound

Clinical data
- Trade names: Singoserp
- ATC code: C02LA09 (WHO) (combination with diuretics)

Identifiers
- IUPAC name: Methyl (3β,16β,17α,18β,20α)-18-({4-[(Ethoxycarbonyl)oxy]-3,5-dimethoxybenzoyl}oxy)-11,17-dimethoxyyohimban-16-carboxylate
- CAS Number: 84-36-6
- PubChem CID: 6769
- ChemSpider: 6511
- UNII: PPG46JF0EG
- KEGG: D01659
- CompTox Dashboard (EPA): DTXSID9023629
- ECHA InfoCard: 100.001.388

Chemical and physical data
- Formula: C_{35}H_{42}N_{2}O_{11}
- Molar mass: 666.724 g·mol^{−1}
- 3D model (JSmol): Interactive image
- SMILES: CCOC(=O)Oc1c(cc(cc1OC)C(=O)O[C@@H]2C[C@@H]3CN4CCc5c6ccc(cc6[nH]c5[C@H]4C[C@@H]3[C@@H]([C@H]2OC)C(=O)OC)OC)OC
- InChI: InChI=1S/C35H42N2O11/c1-7-46-35(40)48-31-26(42-3)12-18(13-27(31)43-4)33(38)47-28-14-19-17-37-11-10-22-21-9-8-20(41-2)15-24(21)36-30(22)25(37)16-23(19)29(32(28)44-5)34(39)45-6/h8-9,12-13,15,19,23,25,28-29,32,36H,7,10-11,14,16-17H2,1-6H3/t19-,23+,25-,28-,29+,32+/m1/s1; Key:ZCDNRPPFBQDQHR-SSYATKPKSA-N

Syrosingopine is a drug, derived from reserpine. It is used (since about 1960) to treat hypertension.

== Research ==
A combination of the diabetes drug metformin and syrosingopine killed tumor cells in blood samples from leukemia patients, while it did not damage blood cells in samples from healthy patients. The combination of metformin and syrosingopine also reduced or eliminated tumors in mice with malignant liver cancer. The drugs interfere with the cancer cells' glucose (i.e. energy) supply and utilization. Cancer cells have much higher energy requirements than normal cells, making them vulnerable when there is a reduction in the available energy supply. Syrosingopine inhibits the degradation of sugars within the cells.
