= Trimetaphan camsilate =

Chemical compound

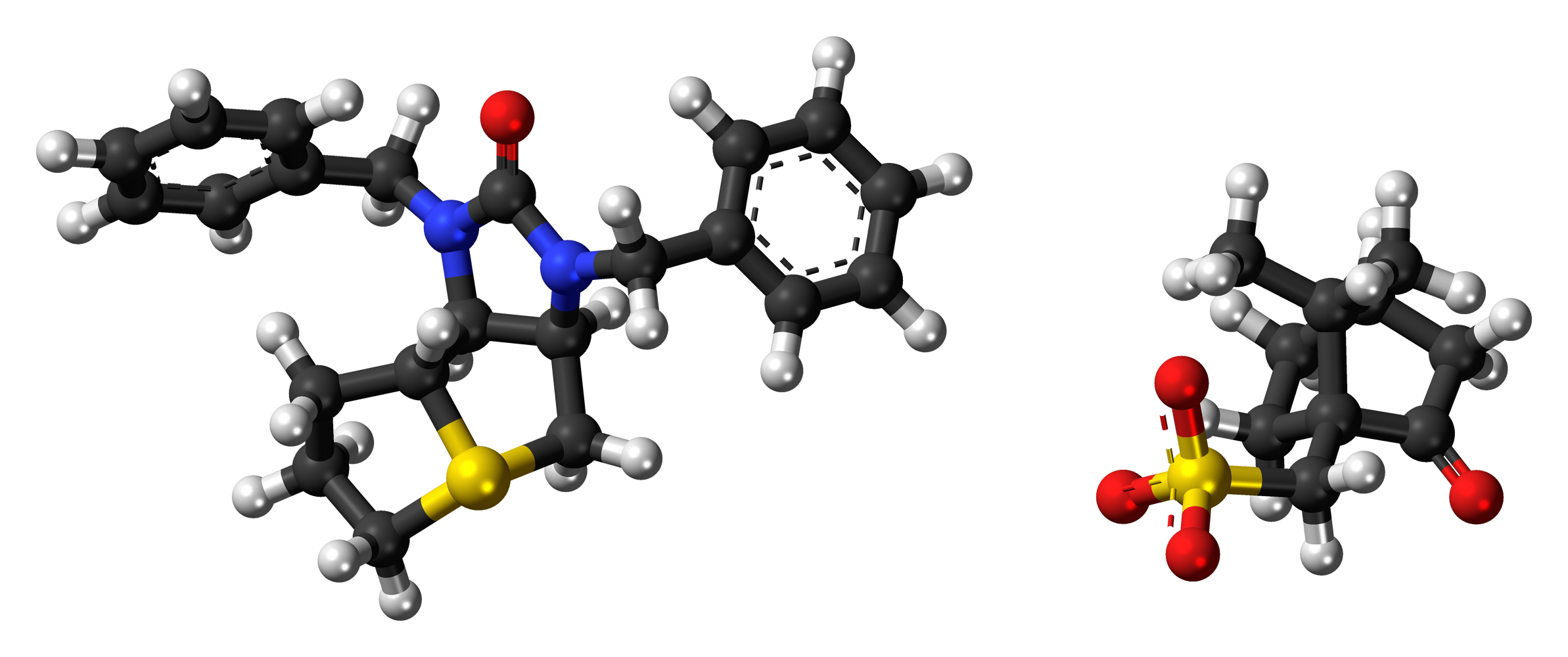

Clinical data
- Trade names: Arfonad
- Routes of administration: Oral, IM, IV
- ATC code: C02BA01 (WHO)

Pharmacokinetic data
- Excretion: Renal, mostly unchanged

Identifiers
- IUPAC name: 3,5-dibenzyl-4-oxo-8λ^{4}-thia-3,5-diazatricyclo[6.3.0.0^{2,6}]undecan-8-ylium (7,7-dimethyl-2-oxobicyclo[2.2.1]heptan-1-yl)methanesulfonate
- CAS Number: 68-91-7
- PubChem CID: 23576
- DrugBank: DB01116
- UNII: 8W556014K9
- KEGG: D00612
- ChEMBL: ChEMBL1245
- CompTox Dashboard (EPA): DTXSID3023710
- ECHA InfoCard: 100.000.633

Chemical and physical data
- Formula: C_{22}H_{25}N_{2}OS (free base)
- Molar mass: 365.52 g·mol^{−1}

Trimetaphan camsilate (INN) or trimethaphan camsylate (USAN), sold under the trade name Arfonad, is a sympatholytic drug that is infrequently used to lower blood pressure.

Trimetaphan is a ganglionic blocker: it counteracts cholinergic transmission at α3β4 nicotinic acetylcholine receptors in the autonomic ganglia and, therefore, blocks both the sympathetic nervous system and the parasympathetic nervous system. It functions as a non-depolarizing competitive antagonist at the nicotinic receptor, has a short duration of action, and is administered intravenously.

It was discovered by Leo Sternbach.

== Effects ==
Trimetaphan is a sulfonium compound and, as such, carries a positive charge. This charge prevents it from crossing lipid cell membranes, including those that comprise the blood–brain barrier. Consequently, trimethaphan has no effect on the central nervous system.

The ciliary muscle of the eye functions to round the lens for accommodation and is primarily controlled by parasympathetic system input. When a ganglion-blocking drug is administered, the ciliary muscle is unable to contract (cycloplegia), and the patient loses the ability to focus.

Trimetaphan has a significant effect on the cardiovascular system. Blood vessel size is primarily controlled by the sympathetic nervous system. Loss of sympathetic system input to the blood vessels causes them to dilate (vasodilation), which lowers blood pressure. Postural hypotension is a common side effect of these drugs. Trimethaphan causes histamine release, further decreasing blood pressure. Effects on the heart include a decreased force of contraction and an increase in heart rate (tachycardia). Reflexive tachycardia can be diminished or undetected because trimetaphan also blocks the sympathetic ganglia innervating the heart.

The motility of the gastrointestinal tract is regulated by the parasympathetic system, and blockage of this input results in diminished motility and constipation.

A rare side effect of trimethaphan administration is sudden respiratory arrest. The mechanism behind this is unknown, as trimethaphan does not appear to block the neuromuscular transmission, and respiratory arrest is not an expected consequence of ganglionic blockage.

== Therapeutic uses ==
The therapeutic uses of trimetaphan are limited due to the availability of newer drugs that are more selective in their actions and effects. It is occasionally used to treat a hypertensive crisis and dissecting aortic aneurysm, to treat pulmonary edema, and to reduce bleeding during neurosurgery.
