= Guanoclor =

Chemical compound

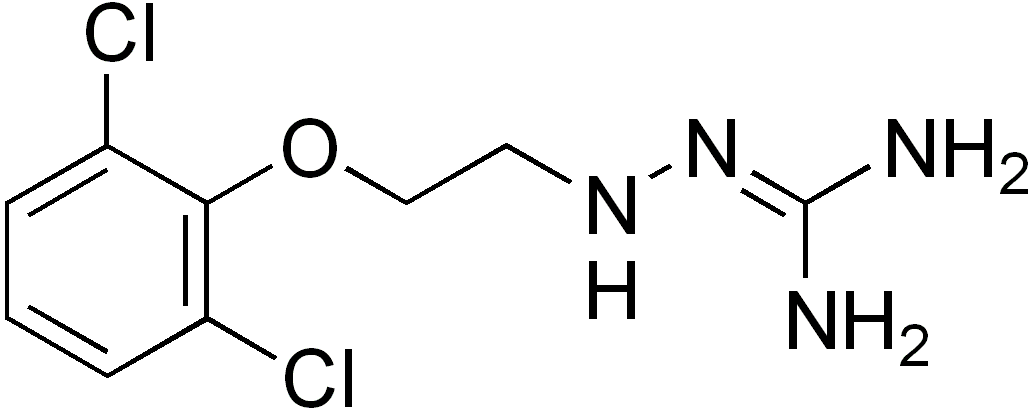

Clinical data
- ATC code: C02CC05 (WHO)

Identifiers
- IUPAC name: 2-{[2-(2,6-Dichlorophenoxy)ethyl]amino}guanidine
- CAS Number: 5001-32-1
- PubChem CID: 71835
- ChemSpider: 64857
- UNII: M4HBT852YO
- CompTox Dashboard (EPA): DTXSID10198184
- ECHA InfoCard: 100.023.334

Chemical and physical data
- Formula: C_{9}H_{12}Cl_{2}N_{4}O
- Molar mass: 263.12 g·mol^{−1}
- 3D model (JSmol): Interactive image
- SMILES: C1=CC(=C(C(=C1)Cl)OCCNNC(=N)N)Cl
- InChI: InChI=1S/C9H12Cl2N4O/c10-6-2-1-3-7(11)8(6)16-5-4-14-15-9(12)13/h1-3,14H,4-5H2,(H4,12,13,15); Key:XIHXRRMCNSMUET-UHFFFAOYSA-N

Guanoclor (INN), also known as guanochlor, is a sympatholytic drug. It is known to bind to non-adrenergic sites in pig kidney membranes.

== Synthesis ==
When β-(2,6-dichlorophenoxy)ethyl bromide (1) is reacted with hydrazine to give 2, and this is reacted with S-methylthiourea, guanochlor (3) results.

Guanoclor synthesis
