= Naftopidil =

Chemical compound

Clinical data
- Trade names: Flivas
- AHFS/Drugs.com: International Drug Names
- Routes of administration: Oral
- ATC code: none

Legal status
- Legal status: In general: ℞ (Prescription only)

Identifiers
- IUPAC name: 1-[4-(2-methoxyphenyl)piperazin-1-yl]-3-(1-naphthyloxy)propan-2-ol
- CAS Number: 57149-07-2
- PubChem CID: 4418
- ChemSpider: 4265
- UNII: R9PHW59SFN
- CompTox Dashboard (EPA): DTXSID5045176
- ECHA InfoCard: 100.220.557

Chemical and physical data
- Formula: C_{24}H_{28}N_{2}O_{3}
- Molar mass: 392.499 g·mol^{−1}
- 3D model (JSmol): Interactive image
- SMILES: COC1=CC=CC=C1N2CCN(CC2)CC(COC3=CC=CC4=CC=CC=C43)O
- InChI: InChI=1S/C24H28N2O3/c1-28-24-11-5-4-10-22(24)26-15-13-25(14-16-26)17-20(27)18-29-23-12-6-8-19-7-2-3-9-21(19)23/h2-12,20,27H,13-18H2,1H3; Key:HRRBJVNMSRJFHQ-UHFFFAOYSA-N

Naftopidil (INN, marketed under the brand name Flivas) is a drug used in benign prostatic hyperplasia which acts as a selective α_{1}-adrenergic receptor antagonist or alpha-1 blocker.

== Synthesis ==

The reaction of 1-naphthol (1) with epichlorohydrin (2) in the presence of alkali gives the epoxide (3). Alkylation of the piperazine derivative (4) yields naftopidil.

== See also ==
- Urapidil
