= Bethanidine =

Chemical compound

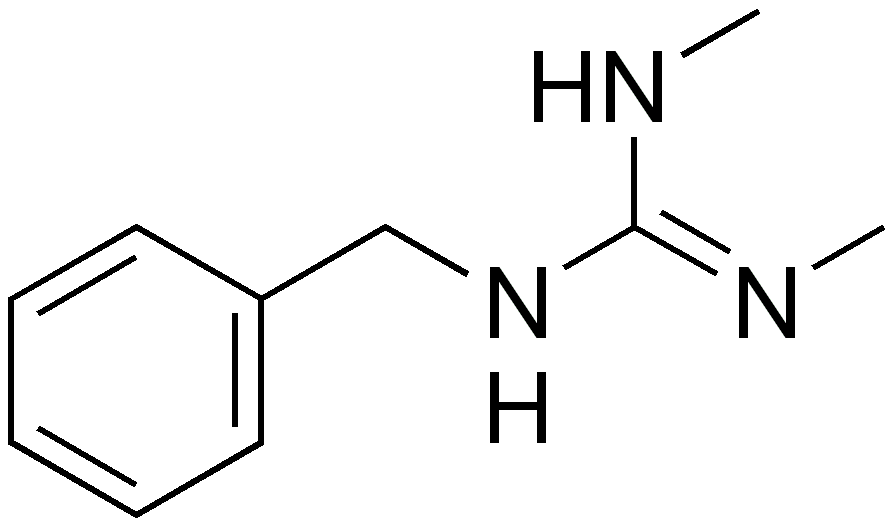

Clinical data
- ATC code: C02CC01 (WHO)

Identifiers
- IUPAC name: 3-benzyl-1,2-dimethylguanidine
- CAS Number: 55-73-2
- PubChem CID: 2368
- IUPHAR/BPS: 7618
- DrugBank: DB00217
- ChemSpider: 2278
- UNII: W8S3YM7AUU
- KEGG: D01603
- ChEBI: CHEBI:37937
- ChEMBL: ChEMBL1201260
- CompTox Dashboard (EPA): DTXSID7022677

Chemical and physical data
- Formula: C_{10}H_{15}N_{3}
- Molar mass: 177.251 g·mol^{−1}
- 3D model (JSmol): Interactive image
- SMILES: N(=C(/NCc1ccccc1)NC)\C
- InChI: InChI=1S/C10H15N3/c1-11-10(12-2)13-8-9-6-4-3-5-7-9/h3-7H,8H2,1-2H3,(H2,11,12,13); Key:NIVZHWNOUVJHKV-UHFFFAOYSA-N

Bethanidine (or betanidine) is a sympatholytic drug.

== See also ==
- Phenoxybenzamine
