= Guanfacine =

Medication used for high blood pressure and ADHD

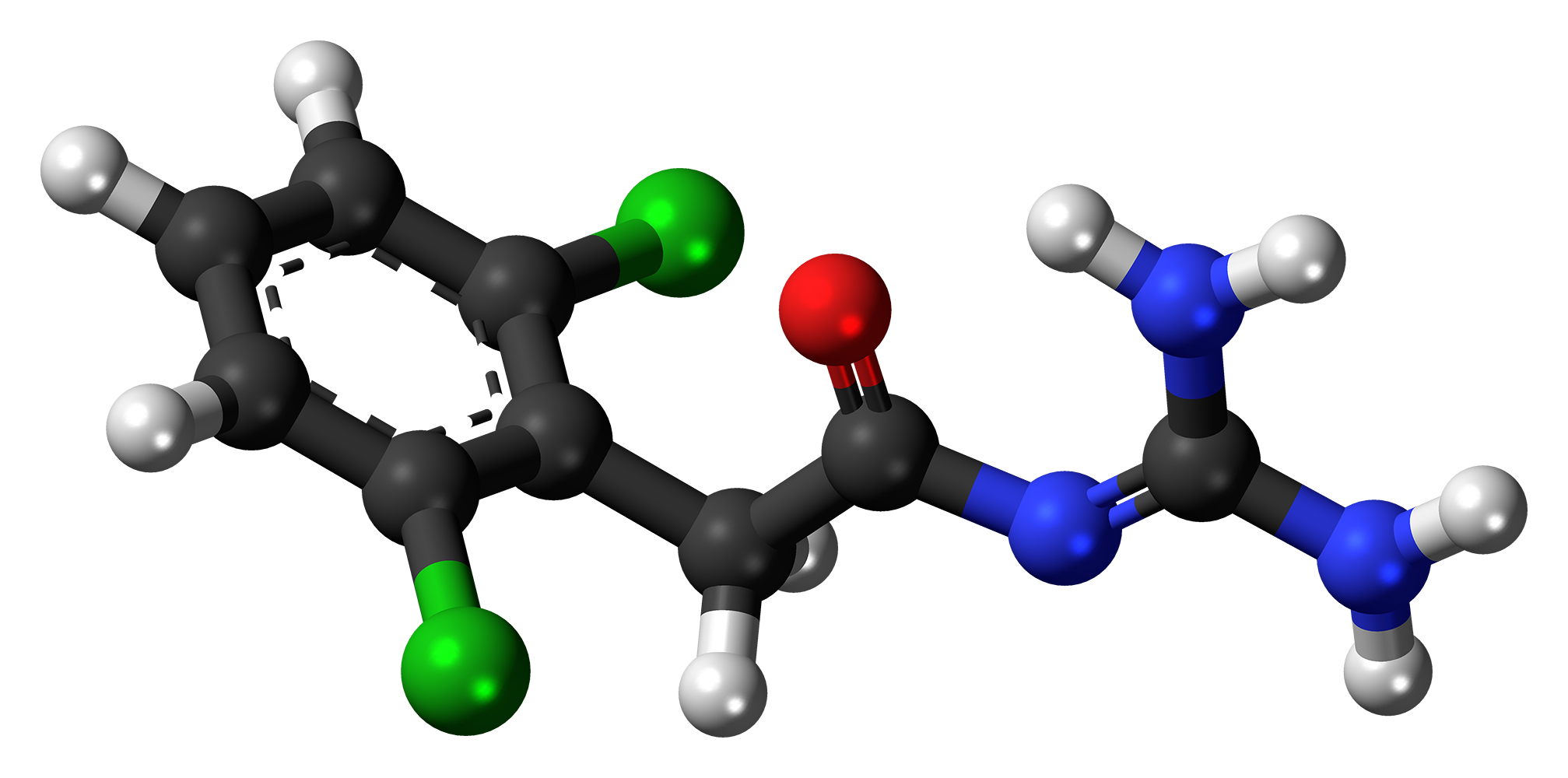

Clinical data
- Pronunciation: /ˈɡwɑːnfəsin/ GWAHN-fə-seen
- Trade names: Intuniv, others
- AHFS/Drugs.com: Monograph
- MedlinePlus: a601059
- License data: US DailyMed: Guanfacine
- Routes of administration: Oral
- Drug class: α_{2A}-adrenergic receptor agonist, antihypertensive, anxiolytic
- ATC code: C02AC02 (WHO)

Legal status
- Legal status: AU: S4 (Prescription only); CA: ℞-only; US: ℞-only; EU: Rx-only

Pharmacokinetic data
- Bioavailability: 80–100% (IR), 58% (XR)
- Protein binding: 70%
- Metabolism: CYP3A4
- Elimination half-life: IR: 10–17 hours; XR: 17 hours (10–30) in adults & adolescents and 14 hours in children
- Excretion: Kidney (80%; 50% [range: 40–75%] as unchanged drug)

Identifiers
- IUPAC name: N-(diaminomethylidene)-2-(2,6-dichlorophenyl)acetamide
- CAS Number: 29110-47-2
- PubChem CID: 3519
- IUPHAR/BPS: 522
- DrugBank: DB01018
- ChemSpider: 3399
- UNII: 30OMY4G3MK
- KEGG: D08031
- ChEMBL: ChEMBL862
- CompTox Dashboard (EPA): DTXSID9046944
- ECHA InfoCard: 100.044.933

Chemical and physical data
- Formula: C_{9}H_{9}Cl_{2}N_{3}O
- Molar mass: 246.09 g·mol^{−1}
- 3D model (JSmol): Interactive image
- SMILES: Clc1cccc(Cl)c1CC(=O)\N=C(/N)N
- InChI: InChI=1S/C9H9Cl2N3O/c10-6-2-1-3-7(11)5(6)4-8(15)14-9(12)13/h1-3H,4H2,(H4,12,13,14,15); Key:INJOMKTZOLKMBF-UHFFFAOYSA-N

Guanfacine, sold under the brand name Tenex (immediate-release) and Intuniv (extended-release) among others, is an oral alpha-2a agonist medication used to treat attention deficit hyperactivity disorder (ADHD) and high blood pressure.

Common side effects include sleepiness, constipation, and dry mouth. Other side effects may include low blood pressure and urinary problems. It appears to work by activating α_{2A}-adrenergic receptors in the brain, thereby decreasing sympathetic nervous system activity.

Guanfacine was first described in 1974 and was approved for medical use in the United States in 1986. It is available as a generic medication. In 2023, it was the 263rd most commonly prescribed medication in the United States, with more than 1 million prescriptions. Guanfacine is approved in the US for monotherapy treatment of attention deficit hyperactivity disorder, as well as being used for augmentation of stimulant medications. Guanfacine is also used off-label to treat tic disorders, anxiety disorders, and post-traumatic stress disorder (PTSD).

== Medical uses ==
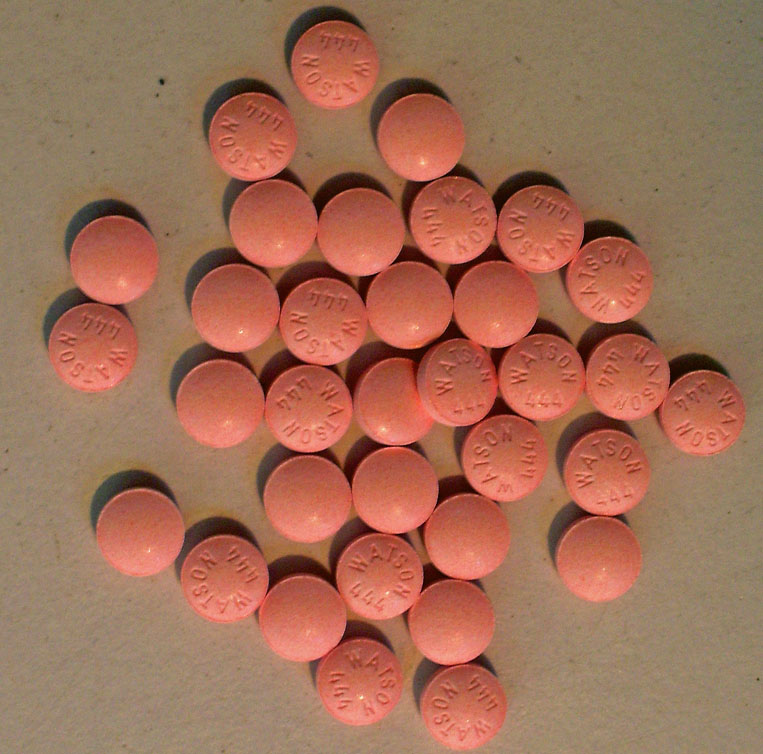
1 mg guanfacine tablets.

Guanfacine IR (as the brand name Tenex) is FDA-approved for the management of hypertension.

Guanfacine XR (as brand name Intuniv) is indicated for the treatment of attention deficit hyperactivity disorder (ADHD), primarily for hyperactive symptoms. It is used both as monotherapy and as adjunctive therapy to stimulant medications. In some cases, it can also help control the side effect profile of stimulant medications. Unlike stimulant medications, guanfacine is regarded as having no abuse potential. However, stimulant medications still remain the first-line treatment for ADHD, and guanfacine is typically only prescribed by itself in patients who cannot take stimulant medications (due to mental or physical side effects).

For attention deficit hyperactivity disorder (ADHD), it is claimed that guanfacine helps individuals better control behavior, inhibit inappropriate distractions and impulses, and inhibit inappropriate aggressive impulses. Systematic reviews and meta-analyses have found guanfacine to be effective in the treatment of ADHD in both children and adults, with a moderate effect size found in adults (Hedges' g = -0.66). A systematic review and meta-analysis also found that guanfacine reduced oppositional behavior in children and adolescents with ADHD who also had or did not also have oppositional defiant disorder, with a small-to-moderate effect size. In any case, guanfacine and other α_{2}-adrenergic receptor agonists are considered to be less effective than stimulants in the treatment of ADHD, at least when compared on rating scales developed to assess stimulant efficacy.

Guanfacine is also used off-label to treat tic disorders, anxiety disorders such as generalized anxiety disorder, and PTSD. Guanfacine and other α_{2A}-adrenergic receptor agonists have anxiolytic-like action, thereby reducing the emotional responses of the amygdala, and strengthening prefrontal cortical regulation of emotion, action, and thought. These actions arise from both inhibition of stress-induced catecholamine release, and from prominent, post-synaptic actions in the prefrontal cortex. Due to its prolonged elimination half-life, it also has been seen to improve sleep interrupted by nightmares in PTSD patients. All of these actions likely contribute to the relief of the hyperarousal, re-experiencing of memory, and impulsivity associated with PTSD. Guanfacine appears to be especially helpful in treating children who have been traumatized or abused.

Other indications for guanfacine are drug (opioid, nicotine, cocaine) withdrawals, migraine prophylaxis, and Fragile X Syndrome, among others.

== Adverse effects ==
Side effects of guanfacine are dose-dependent.

Very common (>10% incidence) adverse effects include somnolence (drowsiness), fatigue, headache, and stomach ache.

Common (1–10% incidence) adverse effects include decreased appetite, nausea, dry mouth, urinary incontinence, and rashes.

Guanfacine has been reported to cause high rates of somnambulism (sleep walking) in children with attention deficit hyperactivity disorder, for instance 73% with guanfacine versus 6% with placebo in one trial.

Guanfacine may worsen sleep in children with attention deficit hyperactivity disorder, including reduced total sleep time.

A 2020 systematic review found side effects of guanfacine including abdominal pain, sedation, and QT prolongation.

== Interactions ==
Guanfacine availability is significantly affected by the CYP3A4 and CYP3A5 enzymes. Medications that inhibit or induce those enzymes change the amount of guanfacine in circulation and thus its efficacy and rate of adverse effects. Because of its impact on the heart, it should be used with caution with other cardioactive drugs. A similar concern is appropriate when it is used with sedating medications.

== Pharmacology ==
=== Pharmacodynamics ===
Guanfacine
Site	K_{i} (nM)	Species	Ref
α_{2A}	50.3 – 93.3	Human	
α_{2B}	1,020 – 1,380	Human	
α_{2C}	1,120 – 3,890	Human	
The smaller the value, the more strongly the drug binds to the site.

Guanfacine is a highly selective agonist of the α_{2A}-adrenergic receptor, with low affinity for other receptors. It is also a serotonin 5-HT_{2B} receptor agonist.

Guanfacine works by activating α_{2A}-adrenoceptors within the central nervous system. This leads to reduced peripheral sympathetic outflow and thus a reduction in peripheral sympathetic tone, which lowers both systolic and diastolic blood pressure.

In ADHD, guanfacine is thought to work by strengthening the regulation of attention and behavior by the prefrontal cortex. These enhancing effects on prefrontal cortical functions are believed to be due to drug stimulation of post-synaptic α_{2A}-adrenoceptors on dendritic spines, and are not dependent on activation of pre-synaptic α_{2A}-adrenoceptors. Cyclic adenosine monophosphate (cAMP)- and calcium-mediated opening of HCN, SK3 and KCNQ channels is inhibited, which enhances prefrontal cortical synaptic connectivity and neuronal firing., mechanisms that are central to Dynamic Network Connectivity. In monkeys, guanfacine improves working memory, attention regulation, and behavioral inhibition, and these actions are independent of its sedative effects. The use of guanfacine for treating prefrontal disorders was developed by the Arnsten Lab at Yale University. Because sedation is a common side-effect of guanfacine, it is often best administered in the evening.

Guanfacine is much more selective for α_{2A}-adrenergic receptors than clonidine, which binds to and activates not only the α_{2A}-adrenergic receptor but also α_{2B}- and α_{2C}-adrenergic receptors and the imidazoline receptor. It is weaker than clonidine in producing hypotension and sedation, has weaker pre-synaptic actions on the α_{2A}-adrenergic receptor than clonidine (10-fold less effective in decreasing locus coeruleus activity and norepinephrine release), and may have greater efficacy in activating post-synaptic α_{2A}-adrenergic receptors (as suggested by guanfacine being more potent than clonidine in enhancing prefrontal cortex-related working memory in aged monkeys).

Activation of the 5-HT_{2B} receptor is a well-known antitarget and is associated with cardiac valvulopathy. However, not all 5-HT_{2B} receptor agonists, for instance ropinirole, have this effect. Guanfacine has not been associated with cardiac valvulopathy despite a long history of use, perhaps due to modest potency as a 5-HT_{2B} receptor agonist. In in vitro studies, guanfacine showed 100-fold lower affinity for the 5-HT_{2B} receptor than for the α_{2A}-adrenergic receptor, 30-fold lower affinity for the 5-HT_{2B} receptor than serotonin, and 1,000-fold lower potency in activating the 5-HT_{2B} receptor compared to serotonin. It was concluded that at clinically relevant concentrations, guanfacine would not be expected to show significant binding to or activation of 5-HT_{2B} receptors, and that it is unlikely that guanfacine is a cardiac valvulopathogen in humans. In any case, different studies have reported different potencies of guanfacine as a 5-HT_{2B} receptor agonist, and as of 2018, no clinical data on the risk of cardiac valvulopathy with guanfacine were available. As such, while the likelihood is thought to be low, guanfacine might still have a risk of cardiac valvulopathy.

Guanfacine has been found to act as a full agonist of the trace amine-associated receptor 1 (TAAR1) with an EC_{50} and E_{max} of 20 nM and ≥85% respectively.

=== Pharmacokinetics ===
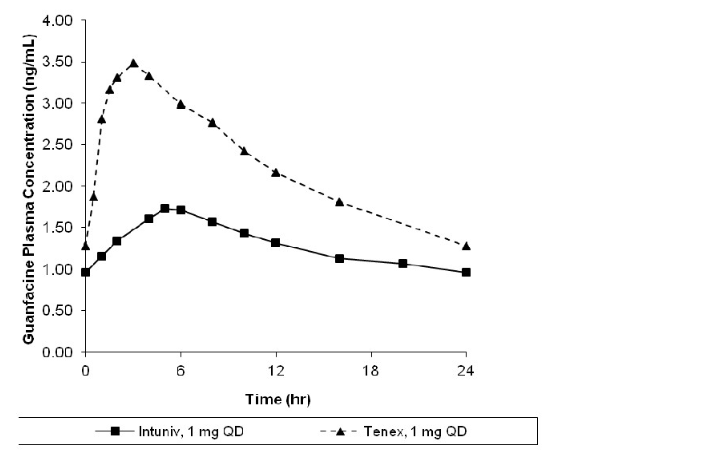
Comparison of Intuniv 1mg QD and Tenex 1mg QD at steady-state.

Guanfacine has an oral bioavailability of 80%. There is no clear evidence of any first-pass metabolism. Its elimination half-life is 17 hours with the major elimination route being renal. The principal metabolite is the 3-hydroxylated derivative, with evidence of moderate biotransformation, and the key intermediate is an epoxide. Elimination is not impacted by impaired renal function. As such, metabolism by the liver is the assumption for those with impaired renal function, as supported by the increased frequency of known side effects of orthostatic hypotension and sedation.

Pharmacokinetic Data
	Intuniv 1 mg QD	Tenex 1 mg QD	Unit
C_{max}	1.0 ± 0.3	2.5 ± 0.6	ng/mL
AUC_{∞}	32 ± 9	56 ± 15	ng*h/mL
T_{1/2}	18 ± 4	16 ± 3	h (hours)
T_{max}	6.0 (4.0 - 8.0)	3.0 (1.5 - 4.0)	h (hours)
Bioavailability	58%	80 - 100%	unitless

== Preparation ==
Guanfacine can be prepared from equal parts methyl 2,6-dichlorophenylacetate and guanidine:

== History ==
Guanfacine was first described in the literature by 1974. In 1986, guanfacine was approved by the FDA for the treatment of hypertension under the brand name Tenex. In 2010, guanfacine was approved by the FDA for the treatment of attention deficit hyperactivity disorder for people 6 to 17 years old. It was approved for ADHD by the European Medicines Agency under the name Intuniv in 2015. It was added to the Australian Pharmaceutical Benefits Scheme for the treatment of ADHD in 2018. In February 2025, the first generic drug of guanfacine extended-release in China was approved for marketing, and the trade name is Le'erjing(乐儿静).。

== Society and culture ==
=== Legal status ===
In December 2024, the Committee for Medicinal Products for Human Use of the European Medicines Agency adopted a positive opinion, recommending the granting of a marketing authorization for the medicinal product Paxneury, intended for the treatment of attention deficit hyperactivity disorder in children. The applicant for this medicinal product is Neuraxpharm Pharmaceuticals S.L. Paxneury is a generic of Intuniv, which has been authorized in the EU since September 2015. It is also a hybrid medicine of Intuniv. It contains the same active substance as Intuniv, but is available at higher strengths. Paxneury was authorized for medical use in the European Union in February 2025.

=== Brand names ===
Brand names for instant release formulations include Tenex, Afken, and Estulic; and Intuniv and Paxneury (as extended release formulations).

== Research ==
Guanfacine has been studied as a treatment for post-traumatic stress disorder (PTSD). Evidence of efficacy in adults is limited, but one study found positive results in children with comorbid ADHD. It may be also useful in adult PTSD patients who do not respond to selective serotonin reuptake inhibitors (SSRIs).

Results of studies using guanfacine to treat Tourette's syndrome have been mixed.

Guanfacine does not appear to be effective for improving sleep in children with ADHD and behavioral insomnia. Instead, guanfacine worsened certain sleep parameters, for instance total sleep time, in one clinical trial.

Guanfacine has been investigated for treatment of withdrawal for opioids, ethanol, and nicotine. Guanfacine has been shown to help reduce stress-induced craving of nicotine in smokers trying to quit, which may involve strengthening of prefrontal cortex-mediated self-control.

Guanfacine has been researched for treatment of a variety of conditions impacting prefrontal cortex function, including cognitive and attentional problems in people with traumatic brain injury, stroke, schizophreniform disorders, and the elderly.

Recent research shows that guanfacine can help patients with the cognitive biotype of depression, and that the antidepressant effect correlates with increased functional connections between the dorsolateral prefrontal cortex and Brodmann's Area 32 in the medial prefrontal cortex, a circuit that provides top-down regulation of emotion.

Guanfacine is being studied for the possible treatment of long COVID, and traumatic brain injury. Guanfacine is also being examined for the treatment of delirium.
