= Rilmenidine =

Antihypertensive medication

- Molecular structure of rilmenidine

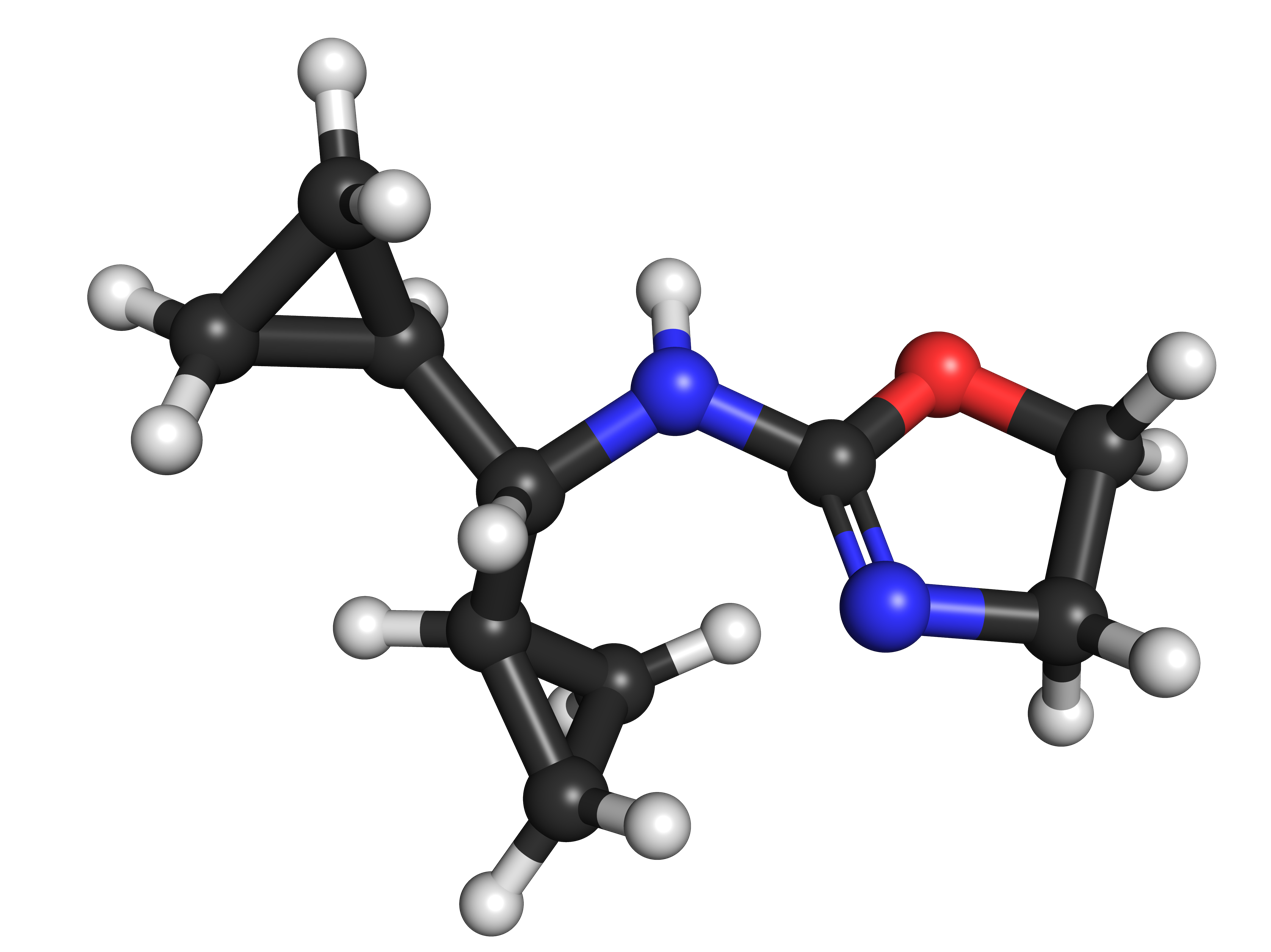
- 3D representation of a rilmenidine molecule

Clinical data
- Trade names: Albarel
- AHFS/Drugs.com: International Drug Names
- Routes of administration: Oral
- ATC code: C02AC06 (WHO)

Legal status
- Legal status: In general: ℞ (Prescription only)

Pharmacokinetic data
- Protein binding: 7%
- Metabolism: Minimal
- Elimination half-life: 8 hours
- Excretion: Renal, unchanged

Identifiers
- IUPAC name: N-(dicyclopropylmethyl)-4,5-dihydro-1,3-oxazol-2-amine
- CAS Number: 54187-04-1
- PubChem CID: 68712
- ChemSpider: 61963
- UNII: P67IM25ID8
- ChEMBL: ChEMBL289480
- CompTox Dashboard (EPA): DTXSID3045194
- ECHA InfoCard: 100.053.638

Chemical and physical data
- Formula: C_{10}H_{16}N_{2}O
- Molar mass: 180.251 g·mol^{−1}
- 3D model (JSmol): Interactive image
- SMILES: O1CCN=C1NC(C2CC2)C3CC3
- InChI: InChI=1S/C10H16N2O/c1-2-7(1)9(8-3-4-8)12-10-11-5-6-13-10/h7-9H,1-6H2,(H,11,12); Key:CQXADFVORZEARL-UHFFFAOYSA-N

Rilmenidine is an imidazoline receptor agonist medication prescribed for the treatment of hypertension. It is taken orally and marketed under the brand names Albarel, Hyperium, Iterium and Tenaxum.

== Mechanism of action ==
Rilmenidine, an oxazoline compound with antihypertensive properties, acts on both medullary and peripheral vasomotor structures.

Rilmenidine is a imidazoline analog and shows greater selectivity for imidazoline receptors than for cerebral alpha2-adrenergic receptors, distinguishing it from reference alpha2-agonists, and conferring additional anti-inflammatory actions not shared with most other antihypertensive drugs.

== Contraindications ==
Severe depression, severe kidney failure (creatinine clearance <15 ml/min), as a precaution in the absence of currently available studies.

== Dosage and route of administration ==
The recommended dosage is 1 tablet per day as a single morning administration. (Each tablet contains 1.544 mg rilmenidine dihydrogen phosphate, an amount equivalent to 1 mg of rilmenidine base.) If results are not adequate after 1 month of treatment, the dosage may be increased to 2 tablets per day, given in divided doses (1 tablet morning and evening) before meals. As a result of its good clinical and biological acceptability, rilmenidine may be administered to both elderly and diabetic hypertensive patients. In patients with kidney failure, no dosage adjustment is necessary in principle when the creatinine clearance is greater than 15 mL/min.

Treatment may be continued indefinitely.

== Precautions ==
- As with all antihypertensive agents, regular medical monitoring is required when rilmenidine is administered to patients with a recent history of cardiovascular disease (stroke, myocardial infarction).
- Alcohol consumption should be avoided during treatment.
- In patients with kidney failure, no dosage adjustment is necessary if creatinine clearance is greater than 15 mL/min.
- In the absence of documented experiments in this area, rilmenidine is not recommended for prescription to children.
- Pregnancy: as with all new molecules, administration of rilmenidine should be avoided in pregnant women, although no teratogenic or embryotoxic effects have been observed in animal studies.
- Lactation: rilmenidine is excreted in breast milk, and its use is therefore not recommended during lactation.
- Effects on the ability to drive motor vehicles or operate machinery: double-blind, placebo-controlled studies have not shown rilmenidine to have any effect on alertness at therapeutic doses (1 or 2 daily administrations of 1 mg). If these doses are exceeded, or if rilmenidine is combined with other drugs capable of reducing alertness, vehicle drivers or machine operators should be warned of the possibility of drowsiness.

== Drug interactions ==
Combination with MAOIs is not recommended; combination with tricyclic antidepressants requires prudence, as the antihypertensive activity of rilmenidine may be partly antagonized.

== Side effects ==
- At a dose of 1 mg given as a single daily administration during controlled trials, the incidence of side effects was comparable to that observed with placebo.
- At a dose of 2 mg per day of rilmenidine, controlled comparative studies versus clonidine (0.15 to 0.30 mg/day) or alpha-methyldopa (500 to 1000 mg/day) demonstrated that the incidence of side effects was significantly lower with rilmenidine than with either clonidine or a-methyldopa.

Side-effects are rare, non-severe, and transient at therapeutic doses: asthenia, palpitations, insomnia, drowsiness, fatigue on exercise, epigastric pain, dryness of the mouth, diarrhea, skin rash; and exceptionally, cold extremities, postural hypotension, sexual disorders, anxiety, depression, pruritus, edema, cramps, nausea, constipation, hot flushes.

== Overdosage ==
No cases of massive absorption have been reported. Likely symptoms in such an eventuality would be marked hypotension and lowered alertness. In addition to gastric lavage, sympathomimetic agents may also be required. Rilmenidine is only slightly dialysable.

== Research ==
The drug has been shown to mimic the lifespan-extending effects of calorie restriction in cell cultures and in the worm C. elegans.

== See also ==
- Moxonidine
