= ATC code C02 =

Pharmaceutical drug classification

ATC code C02 Antihypertensives is a therapeutic subgroup of the Anatomical Therapeutic Chemical Classification System, a system of alphanumeric codes developed by the World Health Organization (WHO) for the classification of drugs and other medical products. Subgroup C02 is part of the anatomical group C Cardiovascular system.

Codes for veterinary use (ATCvet codes) can be created by placing the letter Q in front of the human ATC code: for example, QC02.
National versions of the ATC classification may include additional codes not present in this list, which follows the WHO version.

== C02A Antiadrenergic agents, centrally acting ==
=== C02AA Rauvolfia alkaloids ===
C02AA01 Rescinnamine
C02AA02 Reserpine
C02AA03 Combinations of rauwolfia alkaloids
C02AA04 Rauwolfia alkaloids, whole root
C02AA05 Deserpidine
C02AA06 Methoserpidine
C02AA07 Bietaserpine
C02AA52 Reserpine, combinations
C02AA53 Combinations of rauwolfia alkaloids, combinations
C02AA57 Bietaserpine, combinations

=== C02AB Methyldopa ===
C02AB01 Methyldopa (levorotatory)
C02AB02 Methyldopa (racemic)

=== C02AC Imidazoline receptor agonists ===
C02AC01 Clonidine
C02AC02 Guanfacine
C02AC04 Tolonidine
C02AC05 Moxonidine
C02AC06 Rilmenidine

== C02B Antiadrenergic agents, ganglion-blocking ==
=== C02BA Sulfonium derivatives ===
C02BA01 Trimetaphan

=== C02BB Secondary and tertiary amines ===
C02BB01 Mecamylamine

== C02C Antiadrenergic agents, peripherally acting ==
=== C02CA Alpha-adrenoreceptor antagonists ===
C02CA01 Prazosin
C02CA02 Indoramin
C02CA03 Trimazosin
C02CA04 Doxazosin
C02CA06 Urapidil

=== C02CC Guanidine derivatives ===
C02CC01 Betanidine
C02CC02 Guanethidine
C02CC03 Guanoxan
C02CC04 Debrisoquine
C02CC05 Guanoclor
C02CC06 Guanazodine
C02CC07 Guanoxabenz

== C02D Arteriolar smooth muscle, agents acting on ==
=== C02DA Thiazide derivatives ===
C02DA01 Diazoxide

=== C02DB Hydrazinophthalazine derivatives ===
C02DB01 Dihydralazine
C02DB02 Hydralazine
C02DB03 Endralazine
C02DB04 Cadralazine

=== C02DC Pyrimidine derivatives ===
C02DC01 Minoxidil

=== C02DD Nitroferricyanide derivatives ===
C02DD01 Nitroprusside

=== C02DG Guanidine derivatives ===
C02DG01 Pinacidil

== C02K Other antihypertensives ==
=== C02KA Alkaloids, excluding rauwolfia ===
C02KA01 Veratrum

=== C02KB Tyrosine hydroxylase inhibitors ===
C02KB01 Metirosine

=== C02KC MAO inhibitors ===
C02KC01 Pargyline

=== C02KD Serotonin antagonists ===
C02KD01 Ketanserin

=== C02KN Other antihypertensives ===
C02KN01 Aprocitentan
C02KN02 Baxdrostat

=== C02KX Antihypertensives for pulmonary arterial hypertension ===
C02KX01 Bosentan
C02KX02 Ambrisentan
C02KX03 Sitaxentan
C02KX04 Macitentan
C02KX05 Riociguat
C02KX06 Sotatercept
C02KX52 Ambrisentan and tadalafil
C02KX54 Macitentan and tadalafil

== C02L Antihypertensives and diuretics in combination ==
=== C02LA Rauwolfia alkaloids and diuretics in combination ===
C02LA01 Reserpine and diuretics
C02LA02 Rescinnamine and diuretics
C02LA03 Deserpidine and diuretics
C02LA04 Methoserpidine and diuretics
C02LA07 Bietaserpine and diuretics
C02LA08 Rauwolfia alkaloids, whole root and diuretics
C02LA09 Syrosingopine and diuretics
C02LA50 Combinations of rauwolfia alkaloids and diuretics including other combinations
C02LA51 Reserpine and diuretics, combinations with other drugs
C02LA52 Rescinnamine and diuretics, combinations with other drugs
C02LA71 Reserpine and diuretics, combinations with psycholeptics

=== C02LB Methyldopa and diuretics in combination ===
C02LB01 Methyldopa (levorotatory) and diuretics

=== C02LC Imidazoline receptor agonists in combination with diuretics ===
C02LC01 Clonidine and diuretics
C02LC05 Moxonidine and diuretics
C02LC51 Clonidine and diuretics, combinations with other drugs

=== C02LE Alpha-adrenoreceptor antagonists and diuretics ===
C02LE01 Prazosin and diuretics

=== C02LF Guanidine derivatives and diuretics ===
C02LF01 Guanethidine and diuretics

=== C02LG Hydrazinophthalazine derivatives and diuretics ===
C02LG01 Dihydralazine and diuretics
C02LG02 Hydralazine and diuretics
C02LG03 Picodralazine and diuretics
C02LG51 Dihydralazine and diuretics, combinations with other drugs
C02LG73 Picodralazine and diuretics, combinations with psycholeptics

=== C02LK Alkaloids, excluding rauwolfia, in combination with diuretics ===
C02LK01 Veratrum and diuretics

=== C02LL MAO inhibitors and diuretics ===
C02LL01 Pargyline and diuretics

=== C02LX Other antihypertensives and diuretics ===
C02LX01 Pinacidil and diuretics

== C02N Combinations of antihypertensives in ATC-group C02 ==
Empty group
