= Cadralazine =

Chemical compound

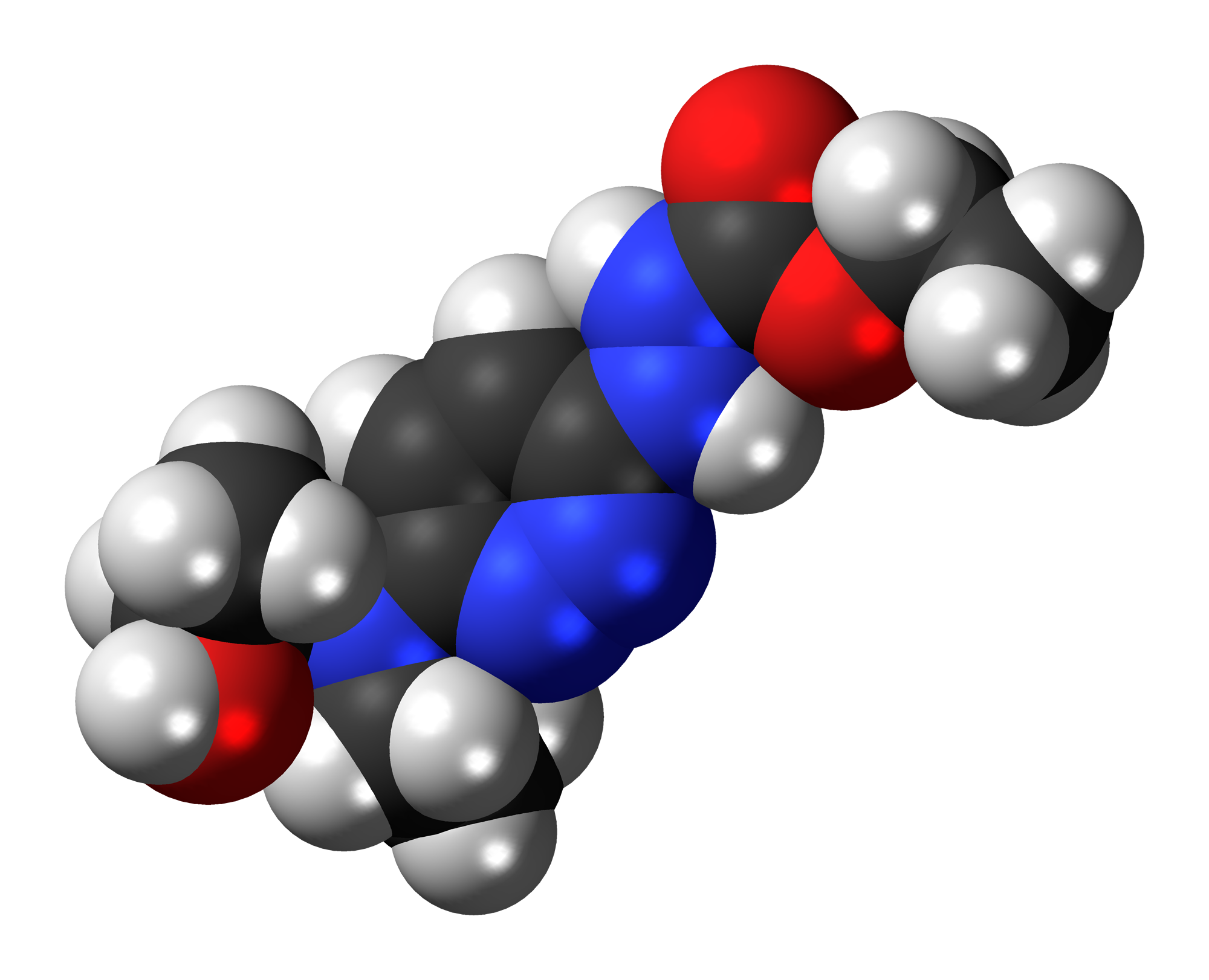

Clinical data
- AHFS/Drugs.com: International Drug Names
- ATC code: C02DB04 (WHO)

Identifiers
- IUPAC name: Ethoxy-N'-{6-[ethyl(2-hydroxypropyl)amino]pyridazin-3-yl}carbohydrazide
- CAS Number: 64241-34-5
- PubChem CID: 2515
- ChemSpider: 2420
- UNII: 8T96I3U713
- ChEMBL: ChEMBL2106561
- CompTox Dashboard (EPA): DTXSID4048725

Chemical and physical data
- Formula: C_{12}H_{21}N_{5}O_{3}
- Molar mass: 283.332 g·mol^{−1}
- 3D model (JSmol): Interactive image
- SMILES: O=C(OCC)NNc1nnc(N(CC(O)C)CC)cc1
- InChI: InChI=1S/C12H21N5O3/c1-4-17(8-9(3)18)11-7-6-10(13-15-11)14-16-12(19)20-5-2/h6-7,9,18H,4-5,8H2,1-3H3,(H,13,14)(H,16,19); Key:QLTVVOATEHFXLT-UHFFFAOYSA-N

Cadralazine is an antihypertensive of the hydrazinophthalazine chemical class.
