= Moxonidine =

Antihypertensive medication

Clinical data
- Pronunciation: /mɒkˈsɒnɪdiːn/
- Trade names: Physiotens, Moxon
- AHFS/Drugs.com: International Drug Names
- Pregnancy category: AU: B3
- Routes of administration: Oral (tablets)
- ATC code: C02AC05 (WHO)

Legal status
- Legal status: UK: POM (Prescription only); In general: ℞ (Prescription only)

Pharmacokinetic data
- Bioavailability: 88% (T_{max} = 1 hour)
- Protein binding: 7.2–10%
- Metabolism: Liver (10–20%)
- Metabolites: Dehydrogenated moxonidine (major), hydroxymethyl-moxonidine, hydroxy-moxonidine, dihydroxy-moxonidine
- Elimination half-life: ~2.2–2.8 hours
- Excretion: Renal (90%), feces (~1%)

Identifiers
- IUPAC name: 4-Chloro-N-(4,5-dihydro-1H-imidazol-2-yl)- 6-methoxy-2-methylpyrimidin-5-amine
- CAS Number: 75438-57-2
- PubChem CID: 4810
- ChemSpider: 4645
- UNII: CC6X0L40GW
- KEGG: D05087
- ChEMBL: ChEMBL19236
- CompTox Dashboard (EPA): DTXSID5045170
- ECHA InfoCard: 100.158.061

Chemical and physical data
- Formula: C_{9}H_{12}ClN_{5}O
- Molar mass: 241.68 g·mol^{−1}
- 3D model (JSmol): Interactive image
- SMILES: Clc1nc(C)nc(OC)c1NC2=NCCN2
- InChI: InChI=1S/C9H12ClN5O/c1-5-13-7(10)6(8(14-5)16-2)15-9-11-3-4-12-9/h3-4H2,1-2H3,(H2,11,12,15); Key:WPNJAUFVNXKLIM-UHFFFAOYSA-N

Moxonidine (INN) is an imidazoline receptor agonist antihypertensive drug licensed for the treatment of mild to moderate essential hypertension. It may have a role when thiazides, beta-blockers, ACE inhibitors, and calcium channel blockers are not appropriate or have failed to control blood pressure. In addition, it demonstrates favourable effects on parameters of the insulin resistance syndrome, apparently independent of blood pressure reduction. It is also a growth hormone releaser. It is manufactured by Solvay Pharmaceuticals (acquired by Abbott in 2009) under the brand name Physiotens and Moxon.

== Mechanism of action ==
Moxonidine is a selective agonist at the imidazoline receptor subtype 1 (I_{1}). This receptor subtype is found in both the rostral ventro-lateral pressor and ventromedial depressor areas of the medulla oblongata. Moxonidine therefore causes a decrease in sympathetic nervous system activity and, therefore, a decrease in blood pressure.

Compared to the older central-acting antihypertensives, moxonidine binds with much greater affinity to the imidazoline I_{1}-receptor than to the α_{2}-receptor. In contrast, clonidine binds to both receptors with near equal affinity. Moxonidine has an affinity for I_{1} that is 33 times greater than α_{2}, compared to clonidine which is only four times greater.

In addition, moxonidine may also promote sodium excretion, improve insulin resistance and glucose tolerance and protect against hypertensive target organ damage, such as kidney disease and cardiac hypertrophy.

== Pharmacodynamic properties ==
=== Effects on insulin resistance ===
In all animal models of insulin resistance, moxonidine had striking effects on the development of insulin resistance, hyperinsulinaemia and impaired glucose homeostasis. Given the importance of insulin resistance as a risk factor for cardiovascular disease, it is of considerable relevance that it has been shown to improve insulin sensitivity.

== Contraindications ==
It is contraindicated if there has been a past history of angioedema; heart conduction disorders (e.g. sick sinus syndrome, second- or third-degree heart block); bradycardia; severe heart failure or coronary artery disease. Also: Raynaud's syndrome, intermittent claudication, epilepsy, depression, Parkinson's disease, glaucoma. Use in pregnancy is discouraged. Moxonidine passes into breast milk.

Moxonidine should be avoided in patients with moderate to severe renal impairment. Abrupt discontinuation of the drug should also be avoided. If concomitant treatment with a beta blocker has to be stopped, the beta blocker should be discontinued first, then moxonidine after a few days. Alcohol may potentiate the hypotensive effects of Moxonidine.

Excess mortality has been seen in patients with symptomatic heart failure in the MOXCON study. However, the MOXCON trial utilised a very high dose of 3.0 mg daily which is well above the normal dose of 0.2–0.6 mg daily.

== Adverse effects ==
Noteworthy side effects include dry mouth, headache, fatigue, dizziness, intermittent facial oedema, nausea, sleep disturbances (rarely sedation), asthenia, vasodilatation, and rarely, skin reactions.

=== Safety ===
Routine toxicology studies have provided no evidence that moxonidine has any teratogenic, mutagenic or carcinogenic potential. No evidence has been found of serious adverse effects on organs or organ systems, and the drug has not been shown to have deleterious effects on perinatal or postnatal growth and development.

== Drug interactions ==
Concomitant administration of moxonidine and a thiazide diuretic such as hydrochlorothiazide gave a synergistic antihypertensive effect.

== See also ==
- Rilmenidine
