= Guanoxan =

Chemical compound

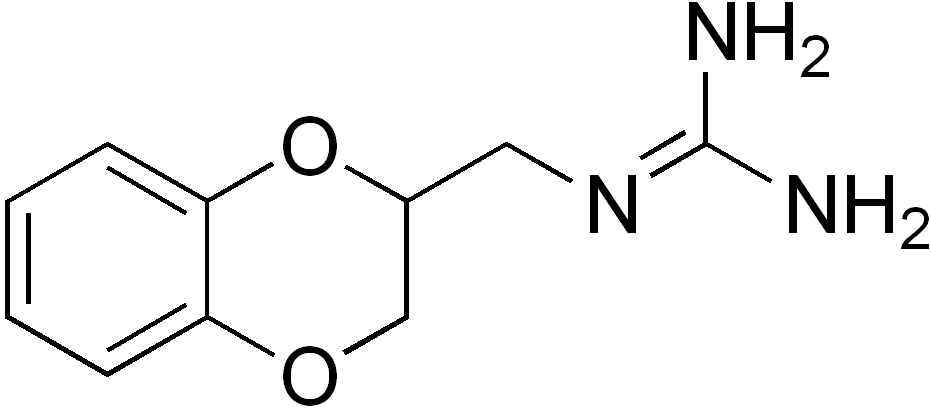

Clinical data
- ATC code: C02CC03 (WHO)

Identifiers
- IUPAC name: 2-(2,3-Dihydro-1,4-benzodioxin-2-ylmethyl)guanidine
- CAS Number: 2165-19-7
- PubChem CID: 16564
- ChemSpider: 15704
- UNII: 9V0MRL0R5Y
- CompTox Dashboard (EPA): DTXSID3046166

Chemical and physical data
- Formula: C_{10}H_{13}N_{3}O_{2}
- Molar mass: 207.233 g·mol^{−1}
- 3D model (JSmol): Interactive image
- SMILES: c1ccc2c(c1)OCC(O2)CNC(=N)N
- InChI: InChI=1S/C10H13N3O2/c11-10(12)13-5-7-6-14-8-3-1-2-4-9(8)15-7/h1-4,7H,5-6H2,(H4,11,12,13); Key:HIUVKVDQFXDZHU-UHFFFAOYSA-N

Guanoxan is a sympatholytic drug that was marketed as Envacar by Pfizer in the UK to treat high blood pressure. It was not widely used and was eventually withdrawn from the market due to liver toxicity.
