= Methoserpidine =

Names
- IUPAC name Methyl 10,17α-dimethoxy-18β-[(3,4,5-trimethoxybenzoyl)oxy]-3β,20α-yohimban-16β-carboxylate
- Systematic IUPAC name Methyl (1S,2R,3R,4aS,13bR,14aS)-2,10-dimethoxy-3-[(3,4,5-trimethoxybenzoyl)oxy]-1,2,3,4,4a,5,7,8,13,13b,14,14a-dodecahydroindolo[2′,3′:3,4]pyrido[1,2-b]isoquinoline-1-carboxylate

Identifiers
CAS Number	865-04-3
3D model (JSmol)	Interactive image
ChemSpider	64824
ECHA InfoCard	100.011.576
EC Number	212-733-5
PubChem CID	71798
UNII	8F8C1JQH53
CompTox Dashboard (EPA)	DTXSID001024699
- InChI: InChI=1S/C33H40N2O9/c1-38-19-7-8-23-22(14-19)20-9-10-35-16-18-13-27(44-32(36)17-11-25(39-2)30(41-4)26(12-17)40-3)31(42-5)28(33(37)43-6)21(18)15-24(35)29(20)34-23/h7-8,11-12,14,18,21,24,27-28,31,34H,9-10,13,15-16H2,1-6H3/t18-,21+,24-,27-,28+,31+/m1/s1 Key: ULBNWNUHGJLQHO-VKMIBBQISA-N; InChI=1/C33H40N2O9/c1-38-19-7-8-23-22(14-19)20-9-10-35-16-18-13-27(44-32(36)17-11-25(39-2)30(41-4)26(12-17)40-3)31(42-5)28(33(37)43-6)21(18)15-24(35)29(20)34-23/h7-8,11-12,14,18,21,24,27-28,31,34H,9-10,13,15-16H2,1-6H3/t18-,21+,24-,27-,28+,31+/m1/s1 Key: ULBNWNUHGJLQHO-VKMIBBQIBR
- SMILES: CO[C@H]1[C@@H](C[C@@H]2CN3CCC4=C([C@H]3C[C@@H]2[C@@H]1C(=O)OC)NC5=C4C=C(C=C5)OC)OC(=O)C6=CC(=C(C(=C6)OC)OC)OC

Properties
Chemical formula	C_{33}H_{40}N_{2}O_{9}
Molar mass	608.688 g·mol^{−1}

Pharmacology
ATC code	C02AA06 (WHO)
- Except where otherwise noted, data are given for materials in their standard state (at 25 °C [77 °F], 100 kPa). verify (what is ?) Infobox references

Methoserpidine is an antihypertensive drug related to reserpine.
