= Clonidine =

Alpha-adrenergic agonist

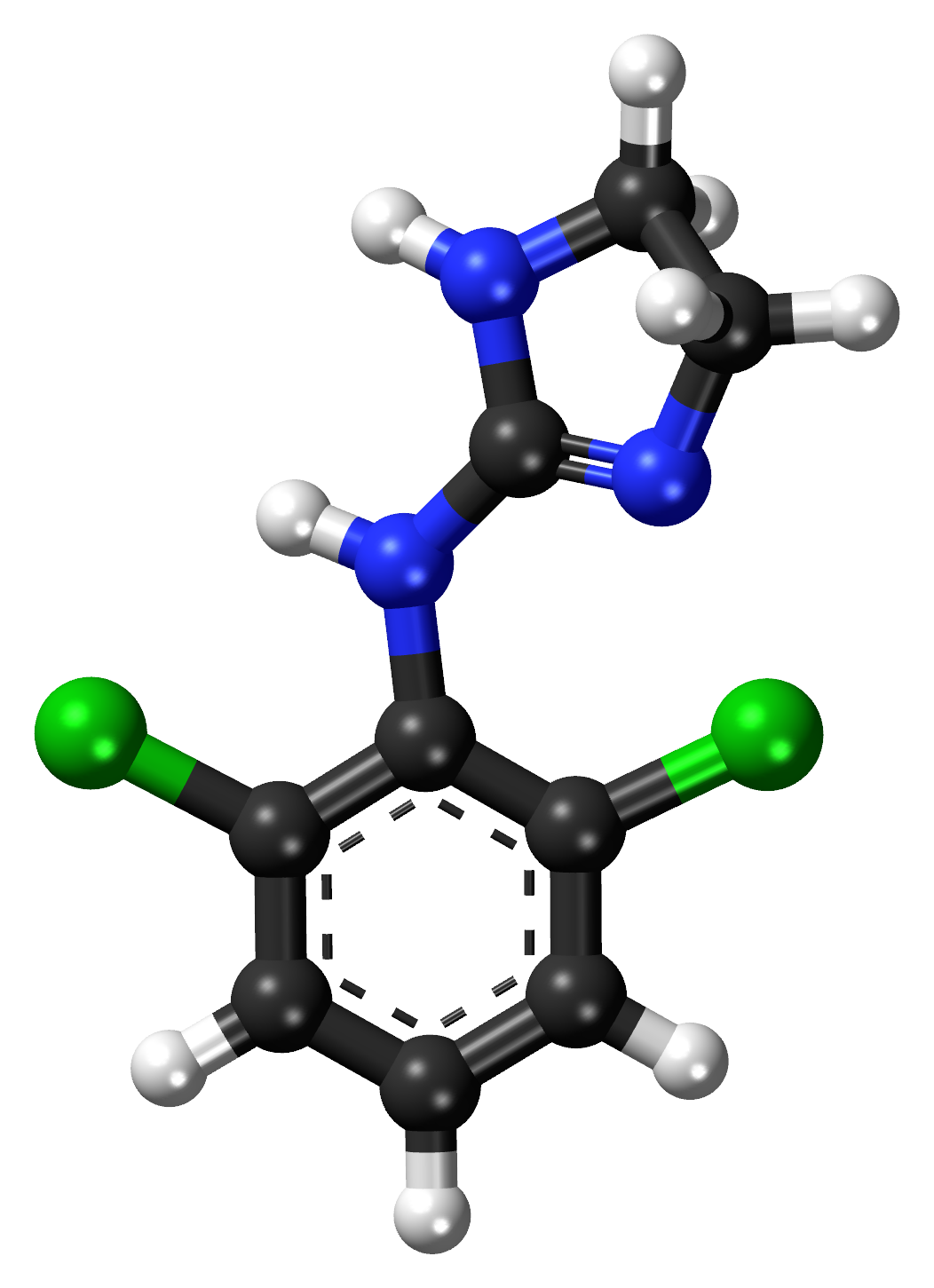

Clinical data
- Pronunciation: /ˈklɒnədiːn/
- Trade names: Catapres, Kapvay, others
- AHFS/Drugs.com: Monograph
- MedlinePlus: a682243
- License data: US DailyMed: Clonidine
- Pregnancy category: AU: B3
- Dependence liability: Psychological: Low; Physical: High
- Routes of administration: Oral, epidural, intravenous, transdermal, topical
- Drug class: • α_{2}-Adrenergic receptor agonist • Imidazoline receptor agonists • Anxiolytic • Sedative
- ATC code: C02AC01 (WHO) N02CX02 (WHO), S01EA04 (WHO), C02LC01 (WHO), C02LC51 (WHO)

Legal status
- Legal status: AU: S4 (Prescription only) / Appendix K, clause 1; CA: ℞-only; UK: POM (Prescription only); US: ℞-only; EU: Rx-only

Pharmacokinetic data
- Bioavailability: 70–80% (oral), 60–70% (transdermal)
- Protein binding: 20–40%
- Metabolism: Liver to inactive metabolites, 2/3 CYP2D6
- Onset of action: IR: 30–60 minutes after an oral dose
- Elimination half-life: IR: 12–16 hours; 41 hours in kidney failure, 48 hours for repeated dosing
- Duration of action: 4–8 hours
- Excretion: Urine (72%)

Identifiers
- IUPAC name: N-(2,6-dichlorophenyl)-4,5-dihydro-1H-imidazol-2-amine
- CAS Number: 4205-90-7
- PubChem CID: 2803
- IUPHAR/BPS: 516
- DrugBank: DB00575
- ChemSpider: 2701
- UNII: MN3L5RMN02
- KEGG: D00281
- ChEBI: CHEBI:3757
- ChEMBL: ChEMBL134
- CompTox Dashboard (EPA): DTXSID6022846
- ECHA InfoCard: 100.021.928

Chemical and physical data
- Formula: C_{9}H_{9}Cl_{2}N_{3}
- Molar mass: 230.09 g·mol^{−1}
- 3D model (JSmol): Interactive image
- SMILES: C1CN=C(N1)NC2=C(C=CC=C2Cl)Cl
- InChI: InChI=1S/C9H9Cl2N3/c10-6-2-1-3-7(11)8(6)14-9-12-4-5-13-9/h1-3H,4-5H2,(H2,12,13,14); Key:GJSURZIOUXUGAL-UHFFFAOYSA-N

Clonidine, sold under the brand names Catapres and Kapvay, among others, is an α_{2}-adrenergic receptor agonist, hypotensive, sedative and anxiolytic drug used to treat high blood pressure, attention deficit hyperactivity disorder, perioperative pain, drug withdrawal (e.g., alcohol, opioids, or nicotine), and menopausal flushing. Clonidine is sometimes prescribed off-label for tics. It is used orally (by mouth), by injection, or as a transdermal skin patch. Onset of action is typically within an hour with the effects on blood pressure lasting for up to eight hours. Xylazine is a structural analog of clonidine.

Common side effects include dry mouth, dizziness, headaches, hypotension, and sleepiness. Severe side effects may include hallucinations, heart arrhythmias, and confusion. If rapidly stopped, withdrawal effects may occur, such as a dangerous rise in blood pressure. Use during pregnancy or breastfeeding is not recommended. Clonidine lowers blood pressure by stimulating α_{2}-adrenergic receptors and imidazoline receptors in the brain, which results in relaxation of many arteries.

Clonidine was patented in 1961 and came into medical use in 1966. It is available as a generic medication. In 2023, it was the 82nd most commonly prescribed medication in the United States, with more than 8 million prescriptions.

== Medical uses ==
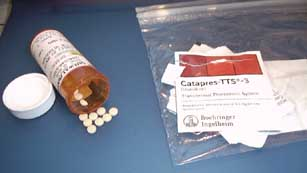
Clonidine tablets and transdermal patch

Clonidine is used to treat high blood pressure, attention deficit hyperactivity disorder (ADHD), withdrawal from drugs including (but not necessarily limited to) alcohol, opioids, and nicotine, as well as menopausal flushing, diarrhea, and certain pain conditions.

=== Hypertension ===
Hypertension is a chronic elevation of arterial blood pressure that increases the risk of cardiovascular disease and organ damage. Many people with essential hypertension experience increased sympathetic nervous system activity, in addition to renin–angiotensin–aldosterone system activation. Clonidine is a non-selective α_{2} adrenoreceptor and imidazoline receptor agonist that reduces sympathetic nervous system output from the brainstem, which lowers peripheral vascular resistance, heart rate and plasma renin activity, thereby reducing systolic and diastolic blood pressure as a consequence.

Meta-analyses of randomized controlled trials in arterial hypertension have found that clonidine is an effective antihypertensive that leads to greater reductions in systolic and diastolic blood pressure than placebo. A 2024 network meta-analysis of imidazoline receptor agonists (i.e., moxonidine and clonidine) reported that this drug class produced ambulatory blood pressure reductions that were close in magnitude to those of commonly used first-line antihypertensive drug classes, but with higher odds of adverse effects such as dry mouth and sedation, especially with clonidine. Hypertension Canada's 2020 clinical practice guideline on resistant hypertension similarly notes that clonidine significantly lowers blood pressure in clinical trials, though it is considered a second-line therapy due to its potential for side effects. A 2025 review of randomized and observational studies on transdermal clonidine reported that once-weekly patch formulations achieve blood pressure reductions similar to beta blockers, calcium channel blockers and diuretics, while reducing the risk of withdrawal-related rebound hypertension compared with oral clonidine.

Clonidine is not considered a first-line treatment for hypertension due to its propensity to cause sedation and xerostomia compared with other antihypertensive medications (e.g., angiotensin-converting enzyme inhibitors). When used for blood pressure control, clonidine is typically reserved for hypertensive emergencies rather than routine management hypertension, but it is considered appropriate for treating resistant hypertension.

=== Attention deficit hyperactivity disorder ===
Clonidine is used as a non-stimulant pharmacological treatment for ADHD and is USFDA-approved in its extended-release formulation as both a monotherapy and an adjunctive therapy to psychostimulants. (Note: Psychostimulants are a subset of the stimulant drug class that are defined by their ability to alter the function of the dopamine transporter, a mode of action that distinguishes them from other stimulants such as caffeine.) Clinical guidelines and comparative-efficacy reviews regard psychostimulant medications (i.e., amphetamine and methylphenidate) as first-line pharmacotherapy for ADHD, while non-stimulant medications such as clonidine are recommended as second-line options because their effect sizes are smaller than those of psychostimulants. Non-stimulant medications, including clonidine, are typically used in individuals who do not respond adequately to psychostimulants, cannot tolerate psychostimulant adverse effects, have contraindications such as a high risk of psychostimulant misuse, or who have a preference for a non-stimulant treatment. α_{2} adrenoreceptor agonists (i.e., clonidine and guanfacine) are one class of non-stimulant medications that treat ADHD by stimulating receptors expressed in the prefrontal cortex, thereby enhancing cognitive control of behavior. Clonidine acts non-selectively at α_{2A}, α_{2B} and α_{2C} receptor subtypes across the central nervous system, whereas guanfacine is selective for postsynaptic α_{2A} adrenoreceptors, a difference that is believed to be partially responsible for clonidine's greater propensity for sedative and hypotensive side effects.

Randomized controlled trials show that clonidine monotherapy reduces core ADHD symptoms, including inattention, hyperactivity, impulsivity and disruptive behavior, compared with placebo. Medical reviews on the efficacy of non-stimulant medications for ADHD indicate that clonidine produces moderate effect sizes for core symptom reduction, which are smaller than the large effect sizes reported for psychostimulants. In contrast to the rapid onset seen with psychostimulant medications, clinically significant symptom improvement may be delayed by a few weeks. Reviews of alpha-2 agonists suggest that this drug class may be more effective for managing hyperactivity and impulsivity than for inattentive ADHD symptoms, and that long-term treatment efficacy has been documented more extensively for guanfacine than for clonidine. Unlike psychostimulants, clonidine is regarded as having no abuse potential due in part to a lack of dopaminergic activity along the mesolimbic pathway.

Clonidine is also used as an add-on to psychostimulant medications in individuals who have a partial response to psychostimulants, cannot tolerate higher psychostimulant doses, or experience notable evening symptoms. In a randomized controlled trial of ADHD children with an incomplete response to psychostimulants, the addition of clonidine extended-release produced greater reductions in ADHD symptom scores than continuing psychostimulant monotherapy. α_{2} adrenoreceptor agonists may also improve symptoms in comorbidities of ADHD such as tic disorders, oppositional or aggressive behavior, and insomnia.

Sleep disturbances are common in individuals with ADHD and may arise both from the disorder itself and as an adverse effect of psychostimulant medications, which can cause delayed sleep onset and insomnia. Whilst clonidine's sedative properties, particularly in its immediate-release formulation, can limit its acceptability as a monotherapy for core ADHD symptoms during the daytime, it has been used as a sleep aid in ADHD individuals who are also treated with psychostimulants and experience insomnia. Evidence suggests that immediate-release clonidine taken at bedtime can reduce sleep-onset difficulties and night-time awakenings, but its treatment effects do not persist into the following day and it is therefore not generally effective for daytime ADHD symptoms when used in this manner.

=== Perioperative medicine ===
Clonidine is sometimes used in perioperative medicine as an adjunctive therapy during the perioperative period, where it is administered alongside other analgesics to provide sedation and pain-control. Whilst clonidine itself has limited clinical utility as a monotherapy for postoperative pain, its combination with opioid medications may allow adequate pain relief to be achieved at lower opioid doses, which may reduce the frequency and severity of opioid-related adverse effects. Compared with other sedative and opioid medications used perioperatively, clonidine does not produce respiratory depression or anterograde amnesia. Moreover, its hemodynamic-stabilising effects and ability to reduce postoperative shivering are considered particularly useful in patients at high risk of myocardial ischaemia. Clonidine also has anxiolytic properties that may help reduce preoperative anxiety. In perioperative settings, clonidine may be orally ingested during the preoperative stage or administered intravenously or intramuscularly immediately before, during or shortly after surgery. Clonidine can also be administered via epidural or intrathecal catheters as an adjuvant to local anesthetics to enhance perioperative and postoperative neuraxial blockade. Clonidine's analgesic effects are attributed in part to activation of α_{2} adrenoreceptors within the dorsal horn of the spinal cord, which inhibits the release of pronociceptive neurotransmitters from primary afferent terminals and hyperpolarizes nociceptive interneurons.

A 2017 systematic review and meta-analysis of 57 randomized controlled trials (RCTs) found that clonidine improved postoperative pain control. In a subset of trials reporting detailed postoperative analgesia outcomes, clonidine delayed the time until patients required additional pain medication and reduced cumulative postoperative analgesic consumption over the first 24 hours by ~24%. The same review reported that clonidine reduced the incidence of postoperative nausea and vomiting compared with placebo. Meta-analyses of α_{2} adrenoreceptor agonists (i.e., clonidine and dexmedetomidine) likewise report small to moderate reductions in postoperative pain intensity and opioid consumption during the first postoperative day, consistent with an opioid-sparing effect, but are limited by substantial statistical heterogeneity. In one meta-analysis of clonidine RCTs, overall adverse event rates did not differ significantly between clonidine and placebo. However, that same paper noted that a large included trial reported a higher incidence of hypotension and non-fatal cardiac arrest with clonidine, and that the available data were insufficient to rule out uncommon but serious hemodynamic complications.

=== Drug withdrawal ===
Structure of clonidine and lofexidine. Both are α_{2} adrenergic receptor agonists and used to ease drug withdrawal symptoms.

Clonidine may be used to ease drug withdrawal symptoms associated with abruptly stopping the long-term use of opioids, alcohol, benzodiazepines, and nicotine. It can alleviate opioid withdrawal symptoms by reducing the sympathetic nervous system response such as tachycardia and hypertension, hyperhidrosis (excessive sweating), hot and cold flashes, and akathisia. It may also be helpful in aiding smokers to quit. The sedation effect can also be useful. Clonidine may also reduce severity of neonatal abstinence syndrome in infants born to mothers that are using certain drugs, particularly opioids. In infants with neonatal withdrawal syndrome, clonidine may improve the neonatal intensive care unit Network Neurobehavioral Score.

Clonidine has also been suggested as a treatment for rare instances of dexmedetomidine withdrawal.

=== Clonidine suppression test ===
The reduction in circulating norepinephrine by clonidine was used in the past as an investigatory test for phaeochromocytoma, which is a catecholamine-synthesizing tumor, usually found in the adrenal medulla. In a clonidine suppression test, plasma catecholamine levels are measured before and 3 hours after a 0.3 mg oral test dose has been given to the patient. A positive test occurs if there is no decrease in plasma levels.

=== Other uses ===
Clonidine also has several off-label uses, and has been prescribed to treat psychiatric disorders including stress, hyperarousal caused by post-traumatic stress disorder, borderline personality disorder, and other anxiety disorders. It has also been studied as a way to calm acute manic episodes. Clonidine can be used in restless legs syndrome. It can also be used to treat facial flushing and redness associated with rosacea. It has also been successfully used topically in a clinical trial as a treatment for diabetic neuropathy. Clonidine can also be used for migraine headaches and hot flashes associated with menopause. Clonidine has also been used to treat refractory diarrhea associated with irritable bowel syndrome, fecal incontinence, diabetes, diarrhea associated with opioid withdrawal, intestinal failure, neuroendocrine tumors, and cholera. Clonidine can be used in the treatment of Tourette syndrome (specifically for tics). Clonidine has also had some success in clinical trials for helping to remove or ameliorate the symptoms of hallucinogen persisting perception disorder (HPPD).

Photoswitchable derivatives of clonidine have been developed that behave as α receptor agonists (adrenoswitches). They can be applied topically in the cornea and allow controlling with light the pupillary reflex of blinded mice and locomotion in zebrafish larvae.

== Adverse effects ==
The most common adverse side effects of clonidine are dry mouth and sedation. Many side effects are dose-related and tend to diminish with tolerance that develops from continued use. For the same reason that clonidine has efficacy for treating hypertension, hypotension (i.e., low blood pressure) and bradycardia (i.e., slow heart rate) are predictable dose-dependent effects. However, with overdose in children, the degree of central nervous system depression does not clearly correlate with the ingested dose.

=== Physical ===
Cardiovascular side effects can include hypotension (including orthostatic hypotension) and bradycardia; atrioventricular block and other bradyarrhythmias have also been reported. Raynaud's phenomenon and syncope may also occur. Because clonidine can cause bradycardia and hypotension, precautions are advised in people with sinoatrial node dysfunction (e.g., sick sinus syndrome) or atrioventricular block, and in those with severe coronary artery disease, cerebrovascular disease, or chronic kidney failure.

Gastrointestinal side effects can include xerostomia, constipation, nausea, and vomiting. Colonic pseudo-obstruction has been described as a rare side effect.

Other reported physical side effects include headache, fatigue or weakness and, less commonly, urinary retention and transient edema. In addition to dry mouth, clonidine has been reported to reduce tear production (i.e., dry eyes), a rare side effect that may be more noticeable in people who wear contact lenses.

Skin reactions can occur with transdermal formulations of clonidine; contact dermatitis at the transdermal patch application site has been reported in about 15% to 20% of users.

=== Psychological ===
Common psychological side effects from clonidine include sedation, drowsiness, and dizziness. The sedative effect of intravenous clonidine is dose-dependent and attributed in part to α_{2B} adrenoceptor activation in the thalamus. Sleep disturbance and depressed mood have been reported, and the Australian Medicines Handbook advises caution in people with a history of depression. Less common neuropsychiatric reactions reported with clonidine (i.e., <1%) include disturbed mental state, nightmares, confusion, hallucinations, and delusions.

=== Dependence and withdrawal ===
Physical dependence can develop with long-term clonidine use, and abrupt discontinuation can cause a withdrawal syndrome marked by a pronounced rebound increase in blood pressure. Symptoms of clonidine withdrawal include a marked rise in blood pressure with symptoms such as headache, sweating, insomnia, agitation, tremor, palpitations, nervousness, and nausea. Among dependent individuals, the severity of drug withdrawal appears to be significantly more pronounced in people with pre-existing hypertension and after prolonged treatment at higher doses (i.e., >900 mcg/day), and severe cases (hypertensive encephalopathy, stroke, and death) have been reported albeit rarely. The severity of withdrawal symptoms is attenuated by tapering the dose.

=== Pregnancy and breastfeeding ===
Clonidine is classified by the Australian Therapeutic Goods Administration as pregnancy category B3, which means that it has shown some detrimental effects on fetal development in animal studies, although the relevance of this to human beings is unknown. Clonidine appears in high concentration in breast milk; a nursing infant's serum clonidine concentration is approximately 2/3 of the mother's. Caution is warranted in women who are pregnant, planning to become pregnant, or are breastfeeding.

== Pharmacology ==
Clonidine
Site	K_{i} (nM)	Species	Ref
NET	>1,000	Human	
5-HT_{1B}	>10,000	Rat	
5-HT_{2A}	>10,000	Human	
α_{1A}	316.23	Human	
α_{1B}	316.23	Human	
α_{1D}	125.89	Human	
α_{2A}	35.48 – 61.65	Human	
α_{2B}	69.18 – 309.0	Human	
α_{2C}	134.89 – 501.2	Human	
D_{1}	> 10,000	Rat	
I_{1}	31.62	Bovine	
I_{2} (cortex)	>1,000	Rat	
MAO-A	>1,000	Rat	
MAO-B	>1,000	Rat	
σ	>10,000	Guinea Pig	
The K_{i} refers to a drug's affinity for a receptor. The smaller the K_{i}, the higher the affinity for that receptor. Reported imidazoline-2 binding is measured in the cortex — I_{2} receptor bindings measured in stomach membranes are much lower.

=== Pharmacodynamics ===
Clonidine produces most of its pharmacodynamic effects by acting as a non-selective partial agonist at α_{2} adrenoceptors (α_{2A}, α_{2B}, and α_{2C}), where it can mimic the actions of endogenous norepinephrine at these receptors in the central nervous system and the sympathetic nervous system. Clonidine can also bind imidazoline I_{1} receptors in brainstem regions involved in cardiovascular responses. Through these actions clonidine lowers arterial blood pressure, heart rate, and total peripheral resistance. α_{2} adrenoceptor activation decreases noradrenergic arousal signaling in the ascending reticular activating system, can modify prefrontal cortical network activity relevant to attention, and suppresses nociceptive signaling in the dorsal horn of the spinal cord.

α_{2} adrenoceptors are G_{i}/G_{o}-coupled G protein-coupled receptors that signal through heterotrimeric G proteins made up of a Gα_{i/o} subunit protein and a paired Gβγ subunit complex (i.e., the β and γ subunits). After receptor activation, Gα_{i/o} and Gβγ can separate, and both components contribute to inhibition of neuronal activity and neurotransmitter release. Gα_{i/o} inhibits adenylyl cyclase, which decreases the expression of cyclic adenosine monophosphate (cAMP) and ceases protein kinase A (PKA)-dependent phosphorylation of amino acid residues involved in neuronal excitability and synaptic signaling. In parallel, Gβγ can increase K^{+} conductance through G protein-coupled inwardly rectifying potassium channels (GIRKs), an effect that reduces neuronal firing through membrane hyperpolarization.

In noradrenergic presynaptic neurons in the sympathetic nervous system, α_{2} adrenoceptors act as inhibitory autoreceptors that inhibit action potential-evoked neurotransmitter release. After presynaptic α_{2} adrenoceptor activation by clonidine, the released Gβγ dimer can inhibit voltage-gated Ca^{2+} channels (including P/Q-type and N-type channels), which reduces Ca^{2+} entry during presynaptic depolarization and lowers vesicular neurotransmitter release. Gβγ signaling can also increase K^{+} conductance (including via GIRKs) to oppose presynaptic depolarization and further limit voltage-gated Ca^{2+} channel activation. In addition, Gβγ can bind proteins within the SNARE complex (e.g., SNAP-25), which can suppress synaptic vesicle fusion downstream of Ca^{2+} entry. These mechanisms reduce the release of norepinephrine and other neurotransmitters from affected nerve terminals.

Clonidine lowers arterial blood pressure primarily by reducing sympathetic nervous system activity and increasing vagus nerve activity to the heart. In the medulla oblongata, activation of α_{2} adrenoceptors reduces the firing of neurons that are responsible for sympathetic nerve signaling to the heart, kidneys, and peripheral vasculature and can slow heart rate by increasing vagal tone. At postganglionic nerve fibers, presynaptic α_{2} adrenoceptors function as inhibitory autoreceptors that suppress nerve-evoked release of norepinephrine and other signaling compounds (including adenosine triphosphate and neuropeptide Y). These central and peripheral actions are associated with decreased plasma norepinephrine and reduced urinary catecholamine excretion, and with reductions in plasma renin and urinary aldosterone reported alongside decreases in total peripheral resistance and heart rate. With intravenous administration, clonidine may cause a short-lived increase in blood pressure attributed to α_{2} adrenoceptor-mediated vasoconstriction in vascular smooth muscle, followed by a more sustained hypotensive response once clonidine crosses the blood brain barrier and binds to its receptor sites in the medulla oblongata; this biphasic pattern is generally less evident with oral or transdermal routes of administration due to dilution of the drug before reaching circulation.

In the prefrontal cortex, α_{2A} is the predominant α_{2} adrenoceptor subtype, and clonidine's attention- and working memory-related effects are attributed to postsynaptic α_{2A} activation. Across the brain more generally, α_{2A} and α_{2C} adrenoceptors are widely distributed, while α_{2B} is primarily expressed in the thalamus. α_{2A} adrenoceptors on dendritic spines of prefrontal pyramidal neurons can close hyperpolarization-activated cyclic nucleotide-gated channels (HCNs) to promote attentional control and working memory. The mechanism behind this behavioral effect has been described as the consequence of improved signal-to-noise ratio in the prefrontal cortex, which can facilitate focused attention on relevant stimuli and improved cognitive control of behavior.

Sedation is attributed to clonidine's activity on noradrenergic neurons of the locus coeruleus and thalamus. Somatodendritic α_{2} adrenoceptors reduce locus coeruleus firing, and presynaptic α_{2} adrenoceptors reduce norepinephrine release along noradrenergic pathways, in turn lowering noradrenergic modulation of arousal in the ascending reticular activating system. α_{2} adrenoceptors are also expressed on axon terminals that release several other neurotransmitters (i.e., serotonin, dopamine, acetylcholine, GABA, and glutamate), and their activation can suppress release at these synapses as well.

Clonidine produces analgesic effects in part through α_{2} adrenoceptors in the dorsal horn of the spinal cord. In primary nociceptive neurons, α_{2A} and α_{2C} adrenoceptors are present on axon terminals and can be co-localized with neuropeptides involved in nociceptive signaling (e.g., substance P and calcitonin gene-related peptide), and clonidine inhibits their release in preclinical models. Activation of α_{2} adrenoceptors in the spinal cord reduces excitatory input to dorsal horn neurons and decreases dorsal horn neuron firing, thereby inhibiting nociceptive signaling. In addition to the synergistic effect clonidine has with opioids, naloxone, an opioid antagonist, can reverse clonidine overdose.

The discovery of imidazoline receptors has prompted investigation of I_{1} receptor contributions to Clonidine's cardiovascular effects. I_{1} receptors are widely distributed, including in the central nervous system, and I_{1} activation has been implicated in clonidine's sympatholytic effect. One proposed model is that I_{1} receptor activation in the brainstem facilitates endogenous catecholamine signaling that then activates α_{2} adrenoceptors to reduce sympathetic activity and blood pressure, but the magnitude of I_{1} receptors in clonidine's hypotensive effects remains unsettled.

==== Growth hormone test ====
Clonidine stimulates release of GHRH hormone from the hypothalamus, which in turn stimulates pituitary release of growth hormone. This effect has been used as part of a "growth hormone test," which can assist with diagnosing growth hormone deficiency in children.

=== Pharmacokinetics ===
After being ingested, clonidine is absorbed into the blood stream rapidly with an overall bioavailability around 70–80%. Peak concentrations in human plasma occur within 60–90 minutes for the "immediate release" (IR) version of the drug, which is shorter than the "extended release" (ER/XR) version. Clonidine is fairly lipid soluble with the logarithm of its partition coefficient (log P) equal to 1.6; to compare, the optimal log P to allow a drug that is active in the human central nervous system to penetrate the blood brain barrier is 2.0. Less than half of the absorbed portion of an orally administered dose will be metabolized by the liver into inactive metabolites, with roughly the other half being excreted unchanged by the kidneys. About one-fifth of an oral dose will not be absorbed, and is thus excreted in the feces. Work with liver microsomes shows in the liver clonidine is primarily metabolized by CYP2D6 (66%), CYP1A2 (10–20%), and CYP3A (0–20%) with negligible contributions from the less abundant enzymes CYP3A5, CYP1A1, and CYP3A4. 4-hydroxyclonidine, the main metabolite of clonidine, is also an α_{2A} agonist but is non lipophilic and is not believed to contribute to the effects of clonidine since it does not cross the blood–brain barrier.

Measurements of the half-life of clonidine vary widely, between 6 and 23 hours, with the half-life being greatly affected by and prolonged in the setting of poor kidney function. Variations in half-life may be partially attributable to CYP2D6 genetics. Some research has suggested the half-life of clonidine is dose dependent and approximately doubles upon chronic dosing, while other work contradicts this. Following a 0.3 mg oral dose, a small study of five patients by Dollery et al. (1976) found half-lives ranging between 6.3 and 23.4 hours (mean 12.7). A similar N=5 study by Davies et al. (1977) found a narrower range of half-lives, between 6.7 and 13 hours (mean 8.6), while an N=8 study by Keraäen et al. that included younger patients found a somewhat shorter mean half-life of 7.5 hours.

== History ==
Clonidine was introduced in 1966. It was first used as a hypertension treatment under the trade name of Catapres.

== Society and culture ==
=== Brand names ===
As of June 2017, clonidine is marketed under many brand names worldwide: Arkamin, Aruclonin, Atensina, Catapin, Catapres, Catapresan, Catapressan, Chianda, Chlofazoline, Chlophazolin, Clonid-Ophtal, Clonidin, Clonidina, Clonidinã, Clonidine, Clonidine hydrochloride, Clonidinhydrochlorid, Clonidini, Clonidinum, Clonigen, Clonistada, Clonnirit, Clophelinum, Dixarit, Duraclon, Edolglau, Haemiton, Hypodine, Hypolax, Iporel, Isoglaucon, Jenloga, Kapvay, Klofelino, Kochaniin, Lonid, Melzin, Menograine, Normopresan, Onyda XR, Paracefan, Pinsanidine, Run Rui, and Winpress. It is marketed as a combination drug with chlortalidone as Arkamin-H, Bemplas, Catapres-DIU, and Clorpres, and in combination with bendroflumethiazide as Pertenso.

== Research ==
=== Borderline personality disorder ===
A systematic review of psychopharmacology in borderline personality disorder identified clonidine as a promising adjunctive therapy targeting noradrenergic dysregulation, especially in comorbid PTSD cases. However, it emphasized the limitations of small sample sizes and called for larger placebo-controlled trials.
