= Guanadrel =

Names
- IUPAC name 2-(1,4-Dioxaspiro[4.5]decan-2-ylmethyl)guanidine

Identifiers
CAS Number	40580-59-4
3D model (JSmol)	Interactive image
ChEBI	CHEBI:5555
ChEMBL	ChEMBL1037
ChemSpider	35305
IUPHAR/BPS	7193
KEGG	D08029
MeSH	C004945
PubChem CID	38521
UNII	765C9332T4
CompTox Dashboard (EPA)	DTXSID2048533
- InChI: InChI=1S/C10H19N3O2/c11-9(12)13-6-8-7-14-10(15-8)4-2-1-3-5-10/h8H,1-7H2,(H4,11,12,13) Key: HPBNRIOWIXYZFK-UHFFFAOYSA-N; InChI=1/C10H19N3O2/c11-9(12)13-6-8-7-14-10(15-8)4-2-1-3-5-10/h8H,1-7H2,(H4,11,12,13) Key: HPBNRIOWIXYZFK-UHFFFAOYAB
- SMILES: C1CCC2(CC1)OCC(O2)CN=C(N)N

Properties
Chemical formula	C_{10}H_{19}N_{3}O_{2}
Molar mass	213.281 g·mol^{−1}
- Except where otherwise noted, data are given for materials in their standard state (at 25 °C [77 °F], 100 kPa). verify (what is ?) Infobox references

Guanadrel is an antihypertensive agent. It is used in the form of its sulfate.

== Mechanism of action ==
Guanadrel is a postganglionic adrenergic blocking agent. Uptake of guanadrel and storage in sympathetic neurons occurs via the norepinephrine pump; guanadrel slowly displaces norepinephrine from its storage in nerve endings and thereby blocks the release of norepinephrine normally produced by nerve stimulation. The reduction in neurotransmitter release in response to sympathetic nerve stimulation, as a result of catecholamine depletion, leads to reduced arteriolar vasoconstriction, especially the reflex increase in sympathetic tone that occurs with a change in position. Guanadrel is rapidly and well absorbed from gastrointestinal tract.

In 1981 the JAMA reported guanadrel as an effective step II or step III treatment of hypertension.
