= Guanethidine =

Antihypertensive drug

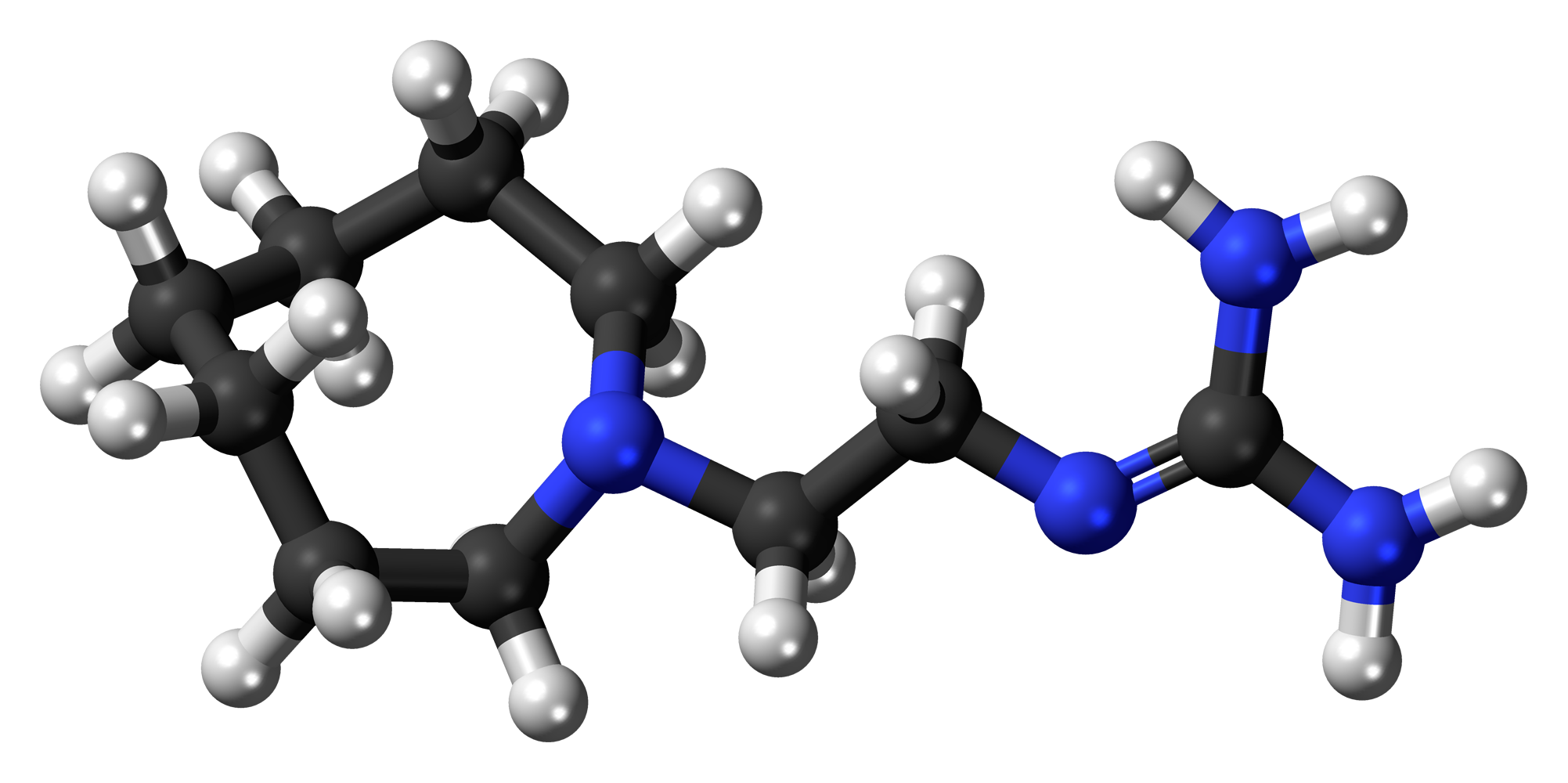

Clinical data
- AHFS/Drugs.com: Micromedex Detailed Consumer Information
- MedlinePlus: a600027
- ATC code: C02CC02 (WHO) S01EX01 (WHO)

Pharmacokinetic data
- Elimination half-life: 1.5 days

Identifiers
- IUPAC name: 2-[2-(azocan-1-yl)ethyl]guanidine
- CAS Number: 645-43-2
- PubChem CID: 3518
- IUPHAR/BPS: 7194
- DrugBank: DB01170
- ChemSpider: 3398
- UNII: 5UBY8Y002G
- KEGG: D08030
- ChEBI: CHEBI:5557
- ChEMBL: ChEMBL765
- CompTox Dashboard (EPA): DTXSID5023116
- ECHA InfoCard: 100.000.220

Chemical and physical data
- Formula: C_{10}H_{22}N_{4}
- Molar mass: 198.314 g·mol^{−1}
- 3D model (JSmol): Interactive image
- SMILES: N(=C(\N)N)\CCN1CCCCCCC1
- InChI: InChI=1S/C10H22N4/c11-10(12)13-6-9-14-7-4-2-1-3-5-8-14/h1-9H2,(H4,11,12,13); Key:ACGDKVXYNVEAGU-UHFFFAOYSA-N

Guanethidine is an antihypertensive drug that reduces the release of catecholamines, such as norepinephrine. Guanethidine is transported across the sympathetic nerve membrane by the same mechanism that transports norepinephrine itself (NET, uptake 1), and uptake is essential for the drug's action. Once guanethidine has entered the nerve, it is concentrated in transmitter vesicles, where it replaces norepinephrine. It may also inhibit the release of granules by decreasing norepinephrine.

== Medical uses ==
Guanethidine was once a mainstay for hypertension resistant to other agents, and was often used safely during pregnancy, but it is no longer used in the US due to lack of availability. It is still licensed in some countries, e.g., UK, for the rapid control of blood pressure in a hypertensive emergency.

Intravenous nerve block (Bier block) using guanethidine has been used to treat chronic pain caused by complex regional pain syndrome.

== Side effects ==
Side effects include postural and exercise hypotension, sexual dysfunction (delayed or retrograde ejaculation), and diarrhea.

== Pharmacology ==
Guanethidine is transported by uptake 1 into the presynaptic terminal transported by norepinephrine transporter (NET). (In this it competes with norepinephrine so can potentiate exogenously applied norepinephrine.) It becomes concentrated in norepinephrine transmitter vesicles, replacing norepinephrine in these vesicles. This leads to a gradual depletion of norepinephrine stores in the nerve endings. Once inside the terminal it blocks the release of norepinephrine in response to arrival of an action potential. Spontaneous release is not affected.
