= Imidazoline receptor =

Receptors of clonidine and other imidazolines

Imidazoline receptors are the primary receptors on which clonidine and other imidazolines act. There are three main classes of imidazoline receptor: I_{1} is involved in inhibition of the sympathetic nervous system to lower blood pressure, I_{2} has as yet uncertain functions but is implicated in several psychiatric conditions, and I_{3} regulates insulin secretion.

== Classes ==
As of 2017, there are three known subtypes of imidazoline receptors: I_{1}, I_{2}, and I_{3}.

=== I_{1} receptor ===
The I_{1} receptor appears to be a G protein-coupled receptor that is localized on the plasma membrane. It may be coupled to PLA2 signalling and thus prostaglandin synthesis. In addition, activation inhibits the sodium-hydrogen antiporter and enzymes of catecholamine synthesis are induced, suggesting that the I_{1} receptor may belong to the neurocytokine receptor family, since its signaling pathways are similar to those of interleukins. It is found in the neurons of the reticular formation, the dorsomedial medulla oblongata, adrenal medulla, renal epithelium, pancreatic islets, platelets, and the prostate. They are notably not expressed in the cerebral cortex or locus coeruleus.

Animal research suggests that much of the antihypertensive action of imidazoline drugs such as clonidine is mediated by the I_{1} receptor. In addition, I_{1} receptor activation is used in ophthalmology to reduce intraocular pressure. Other putative functions include promoting Na^{+} excretion and promoting neural activity during hypoxia.

=== I_{2} receptor ===
The I_{2} receptor binding sites have been defined as being selective binding sites inhibited by the antagonist idazoxan that are not blocked by catecholamines. The major binding site is located on the outer mitochondrial membrane, and is proposed to be an allosteric site on monoamine oxidase, while another binding site has been found to be brain creatine kinase. Other known binding sites have yet to be characterized as of 2017.

Preliminary research in rodents suggests that I_{2} receptor agonists may be effective in chronic, but not acute pain, including fibromyalgia. I_{2} receptor activation has also been shown to decrease body temperature, potentially mediating neuroprotective effects seen in rats.

The only known antagonist for the receptor is idazoxan, which is non-selective.

=== I_{3} receptor ===
The I_{3} receptor regulates insulin secretion from pancreatic beta cells. It may be associated with ATP-sensitive K^{+} (K_{ATP}) channels.

== Ligands ==
=== I_{1} receptors ===
==== Agonists ====
- AGN 192403
- Moxonidine

=== I_{2} receptors ===
==== Agonists ====
- CR-4056
- Phenyzoline (2-(2-phenylethyl)-4,5-dihydro-1H-imidazole)
- RS 45041-90
- Tracizoline

==== Antagonists ====
- BU 224 (disputed)

=== I_{3} receptors ===
No selective ligands are known as of 2017.

=== Nonselective ligands ===
==== Agonists ====
- Agmatine (putative endogenous ligand at I_{1}; also interacts with NMDA, nicotinic, and α_{2} adrenoceptors)
- Apraclonidine (α_{2} adrenoceptor agonist)
- 2-BFI (I_{2} agonist, NMDA antagonist)
- Cimetidine (I_{1} agonist, H_{2} receptor antagonist)
- Clonidine (I_{1} agonist, α_{2} adrenoceptor agonist)
- LNP-509
- LNP-911
- 7-Me-marsanidine
- Dimethyltryptamine
- mCPP
- Moxonidine
- Oxymetazoline (I_{1} agonist, α_{1} adrenoceptor agonist, α_{2} partial agonist)
- Rilmenidine
- S-23515
- S-23757
- Tizanidine

==== Antagonists ====
- BU99006 (alkylating agent, inactivates I_{2} receptors)
- Efaroxan (I_{1}, α_{2} adrenoceptor antagonist)
- Idazoxan (I_{1}, I_{2} antagonist, α_{2} adrenoceptor antagonist)

== See also ==
- Imidazoline
