= C7H5ClO =

The molecular formula C_{7}H_{5}ClO may refer to:

- Benzoyl chloride
- Chlorobenzaldehydes
  - 2-Chlorobenzaldehyde (o-chlorobenzaldehyde)
  - 3-Chlorobenzaldehyde (m-chlorobenzaldehyde)
  - 4-Chlorobenzaldehyde (p-chlorobenzaldehyde)
