= C19H22N2O3 =

The molecular formula C_{19}H_{22}N_{2}O_{3} (molar mass: 326.39 g/mol, exact mass: 326.1630 u) may refer to:

- Bumadizone
- Ervatinine
- TGF-8027
- 25CN-NBOMe
