= ADRIANA =

Clinical data
- Routes of administration: Oral
- Drug class: Selective α_{2B}-adrenergic receptor antagonist; Analgesic
- ATC code: None

Identifiers
- IUPAC name: (1Z)-1-(3-ethyl-5-fluoro-1,3-benzothiazol-2-ylidene)propan-2-one
- CAS Number: 719277-27-7
- PubChem CID: 91810401
- ChemSpider: 103876799
- CompTox Dashboard (EPA): DTXSID001173476

Chemical and physical data
- Formula: C_{12}H_{12}FNOS
- Molar mass: 237.29 g·mol^{−1}
- 3D model (JSmol): Interactive image
- SMILES: CCN\1C2=C(C=CC(=C2)F)S/C1=C\C(=O)C
- InChI: InChI=1S/C12H12FNOS/c1-3-14-10-7-9(13)4-5-11(10)16-12(14)6-8(2)15/h4-7H,3H2,1-2H3/b12-6-; Key:KZNPXNKNIBBYSS-SDQBBNPISA-N

ADRIANA is a selective α_{2B}-adrenergic receptor antagonist. It is described as highly selective over the α_{2A}- and α_{2C}-adrenergic receptors. The drug stimulates norepinephrine release in the spinal dorsal horn and has potent analgesic effects in rodents and non-human primates. It is orally active. ADRIANA was first described in the scientific literature by Masayasu Toyomoto and colleagues in 2025. It is said to be the first selective α_{2B}-adrenergic receptor antagonist to have been developed.

== See also ==
- Alpha-2 blocker
