= C15H11ClN2 =

The molecular formula C_{15}H_{11}ClN_{2} (molar mass : 254.72 g/mol) may refer to:

- PS75
- BQ-869
