= Fipamezole =

Clinical data
- Other names: BVF-025; BVF025; JP-1730; JP1730
- Routes of administration: Oral
- Drug class: α_{2}-Adrenergic receptor antagonist
- ATC code: None

Pharmacokinetic data
- Elimination half-life: 1.2–3.5 hours

Identifiers
- IUPAC name: 5-(2-ethyl-5-fluoro-1,3-dihydroinden-2-yl)-1H-imidazole
- CAS Number: 150586-58-6
- PubChem CID: 213041
- DrugBank: DB06585
- UNII: T5RCK09KHV
- ChEMBL: ChEMBL1255582
- CompTox Dashboard (EPA): DTXSID00869997

Chemical and physical data
- Formula: C_{14}H_{15}FN_{2}
- Molar mass: 230.286 g·mol^{−1}
- 3D model (JSmol): Interactive image
- SMILES: CCC1(CC2=C(C1)C=C(C=C2)F)C3=CN=CN3
- InChI: InChI=1S/C14H15FN2/c1-2-14(13-8-16-9-17-13)6-10-3-4-12(15)5-11(10)7-14/h3-5,8-9H,2,6-7H2,1H3,(H,16,17); Key:KXSUAWAUCNFBQJ-UHFFFAOYSA-N

Fipamezole (INN; developmental code names BVF-025 and JP-1730) is an α_{2}-adrenergic receptor antagonist which was under development for the treatment of Parkinson's disease but was never marketed. It is taken orally.

The drug is a potent antagonist of the α_{2A}-, α_{2B}-, and α_{2C}-adrenergic receptors (K_{i} = 9.2 nM, 17 nM, and 55 nM, respectively). It also shows lower affinity for the histamine H_{1} and H_{3} receptors and for the serotonin transporter (SERT) (IC_{50} = 100–1,000 nM). The drug reduces levodopa-induced dyskinesia and enhances levodopa's antiparkinsonian effects in rodents and monkeys. Side effects of fipamezole in humans occurring more often than with placebo included mild transiently increased blood pressure, nausea and vomiting, dysgeusia, oral hypoesthesia, and flushing.

The chemical synthesis of fipamezole has been described. It is made by the Balz-Schiemann reaction on Atipamezole.

Fipamezole was first described in the scientific literature by 1999. It was under development by Juvantia Pharma and Santhera Pharmaceuticals. The drug reached phase 2 clinical trials prior to the discontinuation of its development. Fipamezole missed its primary efficacy endpoint in the FJORD phase 2b trial published in 2012.

== See also ==
- List of investigational Parkinson's disease drugs
