= 2-Chloro-6-fluorobenzaldehyde =

Names
- Preferred IUPAC name 2-Chloro-6-fluorobenzaldehyde

Identifiers
CAS Number	387-45-1
3D model (JSmol)	Interactive image
ChemSpider	61164
ECHA InfoCard	100.006.237
EC Number	206-860-5
PubChem CID	67847
UNII	51YJ9BW8W7
CompTox Dashboard (EPA)	DTXSID4022028
- InChI: InChI=1S/C7H4ClFO/c8-6-2-1-3-7(9)5(6)4-10/h1-4H Key: OACPOWYLLGHGCR-UHFFFAOYSA-N
- SMILES: C1=CC(=C(C(=C1)Cl)C=O)F

Properties
Chemical formula	C_{7}H_{4}ClFO
Molar mass	158.56 g·mol^{−1}
Appearance	White solid
Melting point	32–35 °C (89.6-95 °F; 305–308 K)
Boiling point	104–105 °C (219–221 °F; 377–378 K)
Solubility in water	Insoluble in water
Solubility	Soluble in methanol, ethanol

Hazards
- GHS labelling
Pictograms	(GHS07: Exclamation mark)
Signal word	Warning
Hazard statements	H315, H319, H335, H401
Precautionary statements	P261, P264, P271, P280, P302+P352, P304+P340, P305+P351+P338, P321, P362+P364, P403+P233, P405, P501
NFPA 704 (fire diamond)	2 0 0
Flash point	101 °C (214 °F; 374 K)

Related compounds
Related compounds	2-Chloro-6-fluorobenzaldoxime; Chlorobenzaldehyde; Fluorobenzaldehyde
- Except where otherwise noted, data are given for materials in their standard state (at 25 °C [77 °F], 100 kPa). Infobox references

2-Chloro-6-fluorobenzaldehyde is a halogenated benzaldehyde derivative with the formula C_{6}H_{3}ClFCHO. It is an intermediate in the synthesis of halogenated heterocyclic compounds.

== Preparation, reactions, use ==
2-Chloro-6-fluorobenzaldehyde is prepared by oxidation of 2-chloro-6-fluorotolulene by chromyl chloride.

It reacts with sodium hydroxide to give a mixture of 2-chloro-6-fluorobenzene and 6-chlorosalicaldehyde.

2-Chloro-6-fluorobenzaldehyde is used in the production of the antiseptics dicloxacillin and flucloxacillin. Additionally it is used in the production of pesticides.
