= 2,5-Dimethoxy-4-cyanoamphetamine =

DOCN

Clinical data
- Other names: DOCN; 2,5-Dimethoxy-4-cyanoamphetamine; 4-Cyano-2,5-dimethoxyamphetamine
- Drug class: Serotonergic agent; Serotonin 5-HT_{2} receptor modulator
- ATC code: None

Identifiers
- IUPAC name: 4-(2-aminopropyl)-2,5-dimethoxybenzonitrile
- CAS Number: 125903-74-4
- PubChem CID: 23900148
- ChemSpider: 23108720
- ChEMBL: ChEMBL8336
- CompTox Dashboard (EPA): DTXSID80635930

Chemical and physical data
- Formula: C_{12}H_{16}N_{2}O_{2}
- Molar mass: 220.272 g·mol^{−1}
- 3D model (JSmol): Interactive image
- SMILES: CC(CC1=CC(=C(C=C1OC)C#N)OC)N
- InChI: InChI=1S/C12H16N2O2/c1-8(14)4-9-5-12(16-3)10(7-13)6-11(9)15-2/h5-6,8H,4,14H2,1-3H3; Key:ULNMEZQBQBLXMC-UHFFFAOYSA-N

2,5-Dimethoxy-4-cyanoamphetamine (DOCN) is a serotonergic drug of the phenethylamine, amphetamine, and DOx families. It is a DOx derivative with a cyano group (–C≡N) at the 4 position of the molecule.

== Use and effects ==
The effects of DOCN in humans and whether it is a psychedelic are unknown.

== Pharmacology ==
DON shows much lower affinities for the serotonin 5-HT_{2} receptors than other DOx drugs. However, DOCN also showed by far the greatest degree of selectivity for the serotonin 5-HT_{2A} receptor over the serotonin 5-HT_{2C} receptor (22-fold) of any other assessed DOx drug. Applying this strategy (i.e., cyano substitution) to the 25-NB series resulted in the discovery of 25CN-NBOH, one of the most selective serotonin 5-HT_{2A} receptor agonists discovered to date.

== Chemistry ==
=== Analogues ===
Related drugs include DON, 2C-N, DOA, 2C-CN, 25CN-NBOH, and 25CN-NBOMe.

== History ==
DOCN was first described in the scientific literature by Richard Glennon and colleagues by 1989.

== Society and culture ==
=== Legal status ===
==== Canada ====
DOCN is a controlled substance in Canada under phenethylamine blanket-ban language.

==== United States ====
DOCN is not a controlled substance in the United States as of 2011.

== See also ==
- DOx (psychedelics)
- 2C-N
- 2C-CN
- 25CN-NBOH
- 25CN-NBOMe
