= C13H17N3 =

The molecular formula C_{13}H_{17}N_{3} (molar mass: 215.29 g/mol, exact mass: 215.1422 u) may refer to:

- BRL-44408
- Tramazoline
