= 2C-N =

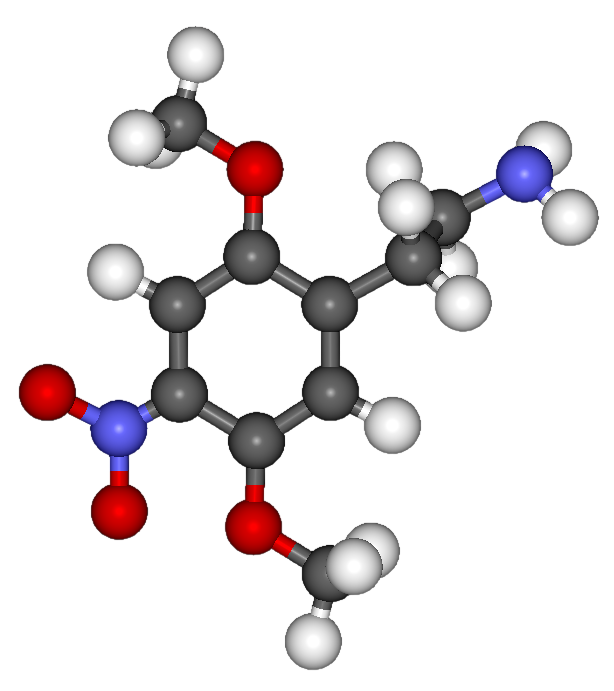

Clinical data
- Other names: 25N; 2,5-Dimethoxy-4-nitrophenethylamine; 4-Nitro-2,5-dimethoxyphenethylamine
- Routes of administration: Oral
- Drug class: Serotonin; 5-HT_{2} receptor agonist; Serotonergic psychedelic; Hallucinogen
- ATC code: None

Pharmacokinetic data
- Onset of action: ≤30 minutes
- Duration of action: 4–6 hours

Identifiers
- IUPAC name: 2-(2,5-dimethoxy-4-nitrophenyl)ethan-1-amine
- CAS Number: 261789-00-8
- PubChem CID: 10036637
- ChemSpider: 8212202
- UNII: BB2B23B11H
- CompTox Dashboard (EPA): DTXSID80180798

Chemical and physical data
- Formula: C_{10}H_{14}N_{2}O_{4}
- Molar mass: 226.232 g·mol^{−1}
- 3D model (JSmol): Interactive image
- SMILES: [O-][N+](=O)c1cc(OC)c(cc1OC)CCN
- InChI: InChI=1S/C10H14N2O4/c1-15-9-6-8(12(13)14)10(16-2)5-7(9)3-4-11/h5-6H,3-4,11H2,1-2H3; Key:ZMUSDZGRRJGRAO-UHFFFAOYSA-N

2C-N, also known as 4-nitro-2,5-dimethoxyphenethylamine, is a psychedelic drug of the phenethylamine and 2C families. It is taken orally.

2C-N was first synthesized by Alexander Shulgin and was described in his 1991 book PiHKAL (Phenethylamines I Have Known and Loved).

== Use and effects ==
In his book PiHKAL (Phenethylamines I Have Known and Loved), Alexander Shulgin lists 2C-N's dose range as 100 to 150 mg or more orally and a duration of 4 to 6 hours. It has an estimated typical dose of about 120 mg orally. Its onset is within 30 minutes and peak effects occur after 1 hour. The effects of 2C-N have been reported to include some visual changes, similarities to MDMA, lightheadedness, eye wiggling, easier conversation, and improved mood. It was described as a "strange material, but okay".

== Interactions ==
2C drugs like 2C-N are known to be metabolized by the monoamine oxidase (MAO) enzymes MAO-A and MAO-B. Monoamine oxidase inhibitors (MAOIs) such as phenelzine, tranylcypromine, moclobemide, and selegiline may potentiate the effects of 2C drugs like 2C-N. This may result in overdose and serious toxicity.

== Pharmacology ==
=== Pharmacodynamics ===
2C-N activities
Target	Affinity (K_{i}, nM)
5-HT_{1A}	1,450–2,200
5-HT_{1B}	>10,000
5-HT_{1D}	832
5-HT_{1E}	676
5-HT_{1F}	ND
5-HT_{2A}	23.5–72.4 (K_{i}); 32.2–170 (EC_{50}); 48–100% (E_{max})
5-HT_{2B}	123 (K_{i}); 730 (EC_{50}); 74% (E_{max})
5-HT_{2C}	162–370 (K_{i}); ND (EC_{50}); ND (E_{max})
5-HT_{3}	>10,000
5-HT_{4}	ND
5-HT_{5A}	>10,000
5-HT_{6}	251
5-HT_{7}	>10,000
α_{1A}	>15,000
α_{1B}, α_{1D}	>10,000
α_{2A}	240–1,300
α_{2B}	2,240
α_{2C}	891
β_{1}–β_{3}	>10,000
D_{1}	19,000
D_{2}	6,100–>10,000
D_{3}	20,000
D_{4}, D_{5}	>10,000
H_{1}	>25,000
H_{2}	>10,000
H_{3}	5,500
H_{4}	>10,000
M_{1}–M_{5}	>10,000
I_{1}	ND
σ_{1}, σ_{2}	>10,000
ORs	>10,000
TAAR1	>20,000 (K_{i}) (mouse); 340 (K_{i}) (rat); 15,000 (EC_{50}) (mouse); 250 (EC_{50}) (rat) >10,000 (EC_{50}) (human); 28% (E_{max}) (mouse); 59% (E_{max}) (rat)
SERT	32,000 (K_{i}); 154,000 (IC_{50}); ND (EC_{50})
NET	>30,000 (K_{i}); 287,000 (IC_{50}); ND (EC_{50})
DAT	>30,000 (K_{i}) >900,000 (IC_{50}); ND (EC_{50})
MAO-A	ND (IC_{50})
MAO-B	66,000 (IC_{50})
Notes: The smaller the value, the more avidly the drug binds to the site. All proteins are human unless otherwise specified. Refs:

2C-N is a low-potency partial agonist of the serotonin 5-HT_{2A}, 5-HT_{2B}, and 5-HT_{2C} receptors.

== Chemistry ==
=== Properties ===
Salts of 2C-N have a bright yellow to orange color due to the presence of the nitro group, unlike all other members of the 2C family in which the salts are white.

=== Synthesis ===
The chemical synthesis of 2C-N has been described. It is synthesized by the mixed acid nitration of 2C-H using sulfuric acid and nitric acid.

=== Analogues ===
Analogues of 2C-N include DON, 2C-CN, and 25N-NBOMe, among others.

== History ==
2C-N was first described in the scientific literature by at least 1991.

== Society and culture ==
=== Legal status ===
==== Canada ====
As of October 31, 2016, 2C-N is a controlled substance (Schedule III) in Canada.

==== United Kingdom ====
2C-N and most (possibly all) other compounds featured in PiHKAL are illegal drugs in the United Kingdom.

==== United States ====
In the United States, 2C-N is a Schedule 1 controlled substance.

== See also ==
- 2C (psychedelics)
