= 25CN-NBOH =

Psychedelic drug

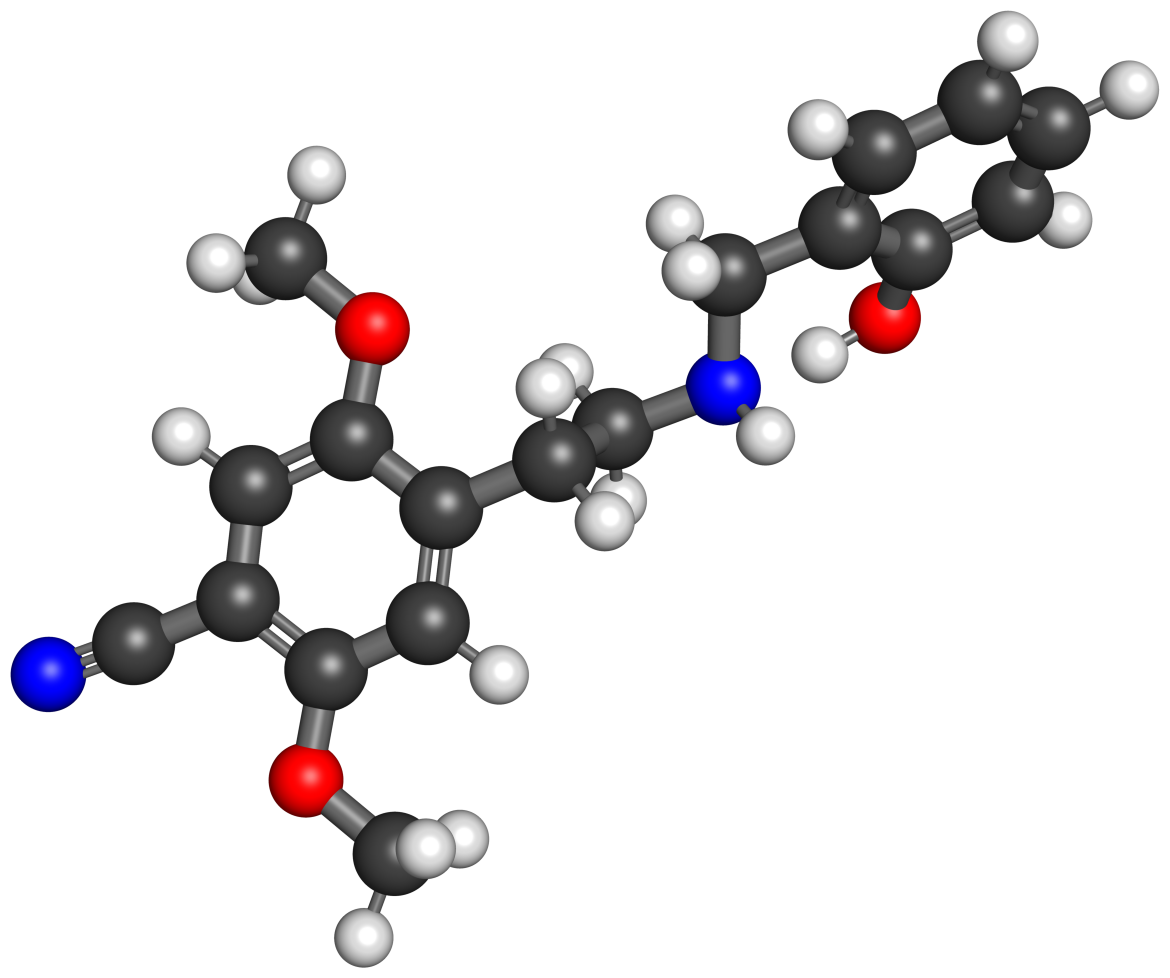

Clinical data
- Other names: 2C-CN-NBOH; NBOH-2C-CN; N-(2-Hydroxybenzyl)-4-cyano-2,5-dimethoxyphenethylamine
- Drug class: Selective serotonin 5-HT_{2A} receptor agonist; Serotonergic psychedelic; Hallucinogen

Legal status
- Legal status: UK: Class A; Illegal in Hungary

Identifiers
- IUPAC name: 4-[2-[(2-hydroxyphenyl)methylamino]ethyl]-2,5-dimethoxybenzonitrile
- CAS Number: 1391489-32-9
- PubChem CID: 90489020
- ChemSpider: 58191431
- UNII: 32CN2DQE3Q
- CompTox Dashboard (EPA): DTXSID301017253

Chemical and physical data
- Formula: C_{18}H_{20}N_{2}O_{3}
- Molar mass: 312.369 g·mol^{−1}
- 3D model (JSmol): Interactive image
- SMILES: COc1cc(C#N)c(OC)cc1CCNCc2ccccc2O
- InChI: InChI=1S/C18H20N2O3/c1-22-17-10-15(11-19)18(23-2)9-13(17)7-8-20-12-14-5-3-4-6-16(14)21/h3-6,9-10,20-21H,7-8,12H2,1-2H3; Key:VWEDZTZAXHMZIL-UHFFFAOYSA-N

25CN-NBOH, also known as NBOH-2C-CN or as N-(2-hydroxybenzyl)-4-cyano-2,5-dimethoxyphenethylamine, is a psychedelic drug of the phenethylamine, 2C, and 25-NB (NBOH) families. It was developed and described in 2011 at the University of Copenhagen.

The drug is one of the most selective agonists of the serotonin 5-HT_{2A} receptor known. However, findings on its selectivity have varied, with some studies finding as little as 10-fold selectivity for the serotonin 5-HT_{2A} receptor over the serotonin 5-HT_{2C} receptor. A much more selective derivative of 25CN-NBOH, TGF-8027, has since been described.

A tritiated version of 25CN-NBOH has also been developed and used for more detailed investigations of the binding to serotonin 5-HT_{2} receptors and autoradiography. In 2025, 25CN-NBOH was suggested as a possible alternative and replacement of DOI for use in scientific research.

== Pharmacology ==
=== Pharmacodynamics ===
==== Actions ====
25CN-NBOH activities
Target	Affinity (K_{i}, nM)
5-HT_{1A}	>10,000
5-HT_{1B}	>10,000
5-HT_{1D}	>10,000
5-HT_{1E}	>10,000
5-HT_{1F}	ND
5-HT_{2A}	0.81–27 (K_{i}); 0.38–8.59 (EC_{50}); 66–150% (E_{max})
5-HT_{2B}	30–75 (K_{i}); 59–145 (EC_{50}); 57–60% (E_{max})
5-HT_{2C}	42–132 (K_{i}); 4.79–350 (EC_{50}); 78–114% (E_{max})
5-HT_{3}	>10,000
5-HT_{4}	ND
5-HT_{5A}	6,591–>10,000
5-HT_{6}	310–573
5-HT_{7}	5,256–>10,000
α_{1A}	>10,000
α_{1B}	>10,000
α_{1D}	>10,000
α_{2A}	803–>10,000
α_{2B}	1,226–>10,000
α_{2C}	543–2,900
β_{1}	>10,000
β_{2}	1,609
β_{3}	>10,000
D_{1}–D_{3}	>10,000
D_{4}	2,900–>10,000
D_{5}	>10,000
H_{1}	2,100–>10,000
H_{2}	1,505
H_{3}	>10,000 (guinea pig)
H_{4}	>10,000
M_{1}–M_{5}	>10,000
I_{1}	ND
σ_{1} (rat)	280–284
σ_{2} (rat)	120–575
MOR	>10,000
DOR	>10,000
KOR	4,200–>10,000
TAAR1	ND
SERT	>10,000 (K_{i})
NET	>10,000 (K_{i})
DAT	>10,000 (K_{i})
Notes: The smaller the value, the more avidly the drug binds to the site. All proteins are human unless otherwise specified. Refs:

25CN-NBOH is one of the most selective agonists of the serotonin 5-HT_{2A} receptor yet discovered, with an affinity (K_{i}) of 1.32 nM at the human serotonin 5-HT_{2A} receptor, 100-fold selectivity for the serotonin 5-HT_{2A} receptor over the serotonin 5-HT_{2C} receptor, and 46-fold selectivity for the serotonin 5-HT_{2A} receptor over the serotonin 5-HT_{2B} receptor. However, another study found that 25CN-NBOH only had around 25-fold selectivity for the serotonin 5-HT_{2A} receptor over the serotonin 5-HT_{2B} and 5-HT_{2C} receptors. In any case, in 2020, 25CN-NBOH and the related drug (S,S)-DMBMPP were described as the most selective serotonin 5-HT_{2A} receptor agonists discovered to date. Subsequently, in 2025, it was reported that 25CN-NBOH had only 10-fold selectivity for the serotonin 5-HT_{2A} receptor over the serotonin 5-HT_{2C} receptor in the G_{q} dissociation assay, whereas its more recent derivative TGF-8027 showed 49-fold selectivity in the same assay.

==== Effects ====
25CN-NBOH was found to partially substitute for DOI in drug discrimination tests but was considerably weaker at inducing the head-twitch response (HTR) in mice. As with DOI, 25CN-NBOH has shown a biphasic or inverted U-shaped dose–response curve in terms of HTR induction. In addition, as with many other psychedelics, tolerance and tachyphylaxis develop to the HTR induced by 25CN-NBOH. A study of 25CN-NBOH concluded that "Given its distinct in vitro selectivity for 5-HT_{2A} over non 5-HT_{2} receptors and its behavioral dynamics, 25CN-NBOH appears to be a powerful tool for dissection of receptor-specific cortical circuit dynamics, including 5-HT_{2A} related psychoactivity."

25CN-NBOH induces the HTRs also referred to as "wet dog shakes" (WDS) in rodents and the cortical fingerprint of serotonin-2A-receptor-mediated shaking behavior has been investigated in detail.

Additional in-vivo investigations with this ligand are emerging.

Selected examples:

Chronic administration in mice lead to desensitization of the serotonin 5-HT_{2A} receptor (measured via HTR) and increased startle amplitude whereas it does not effect reversal learning in mice. 25CN-NBOH was shown to increase the production of CTGF in chondrocytes. In rats, 25CN-NBOH induce a reduction in conditioned fear that was countered by pretreatment with the serotonin 5-HT_{2A} receptor inverse agonist MDL100907.

Notably, a single-dose of 25CN-NBOH enhances cognitive flexibility and reversal learning in mice weeks after administration as well as functional plasticity and antidepressant like effects in rats through mechanisms independent of structural plasticity.

== Chemistry ==
=== Structure ===
Binding mode of 25CN-NBOH in the serotonin 5-HT_{2A} receptor.

The structure of 25CN-NBOH in complex with an engineered Gα_{q} heterotrimer of the serotonin 5-HT_{2A} receptor has been determined by cryoelectron microscopy (cryo-EM), showing a distinct binding mode when compared to LSD.

=== Synthesis ===
25CN-NBOH is readily available from 2C-H in 57% over 4 steps.

=== Physicochemical properties ===
The HCl-salt of 25CN-NBOH precipitates as a single and stable polymorph. The aqueous solubility of this salt is 8.5 mg/mL, leading to a solution with a pH of 6.24. A solution of 25CN-NBOH in water or buffer (pH 7.24) does not show any signs of degradation after 1 month at 25°C. The presence of an intramolecular hydrogen bond may help explain the high membrane permability.

=== Detection ===
A bioanalytical method for the detection of 25CN-NBOH has been developed.

=== Analogues ===
The tendency of the 4-cyano substitution to confer high selectivity for the serotonin 5-HT_{2A} receptor had previously been observed with DOCN, but this drug was not sufficiently potent to be widely adopted as a research ligand. 25CN-NBOH is still slightly less selective for 5-HT_{2A} than the more complex cyclized derivative 2S,6S-DMBMPP ((2S,6S)-2-(2,5-dimethoxy-4-bromobenzyl)-6-(2-methoxyphenyl)piperidine), in binding assays, however it is also less complex to synthesize and has higher efficacy and selectivity in functional assays as a partial agonist of the serotonin 5-HT_{2A} receptor. Other analogues of 25CN-NBOH include 2C-CN and TGF-8027.

== History ==
25CN-NBOH was first described in the scientific literature by Martin Hansen at the University of Copenhagen in 2011. It was subsequently described more prominently, with its binding selectivity for the serotonin 5-HT_{2A} receptor highlighted, by Hansen and colleagues in 2014 and 2015. A review covering the literature on 25CN-NBOH up to 2020 was published in 2021. 25CN-NBOH was suggested as a possible alternative and replacement of DOI for use in scientific research in 2025.

== Society and culture ==
=== Legal status ===
==== Canada ====
25CN-NBOH is a controlled substance in Canada under phenethylamine blanket-ban language.

==== Hungary ====
25CN-NBOH is illegal in Hungary.

==== United Kingdom ====
This substance is a Class A drug in the United Kingdom as a result of the N-benzylphenethylamine catch-all clause in the Misuse of Drugs Act 1971.

==== United States ====
25CN-NBOH is not an explicitly controlled substance in the United States. However, it could be considered a controlled substance under the Federal Analogue Act if intended for human consumption.

== See also ==
- 25-NB
