= Alpha-2 blocker =

Drugs blocking alpha-2 adrenergic receptors

Alpha-2 blockers (or α_{2} blockers) are a subset of the alpha blocker class of drugs and are antagonists to the α_{2} adrenergic receptor. They are mainly used in research, having found limited clinical application in human medicine. They are extensively used in veterinary medicine to reverse the effects of alpha-2 agonist drugs used as sedatives, like xylazine, medetomidine and dexmedetomidine. Alpha-2 blockers increase noradrenaline release.

== Uses ==
Yohimbine, historically used as an aphrodisiac, is sometimes used in veterinary medicine (although now largely replaced by atipamezole) for reversing the effects of α_{2}s such as medetomidine that are used as sedatives during surgery.

The tetracyclic antidepressants mianserin and mirtazapine are α_{2} blockers, although their efficacy as antidepressants may come from their activity at other receptor sites.

Mechanistically, α_{2} blockers increase adrenergic, dopaminergic and serotonergic neurotransmitters and induce insulin secretion, decreasing blood sugar levels.

Withdrawal from α_{2} blockers can be difficult or dangerous as the global downregulation of neurotransmitters may cause symptoms of depression and other neurological problems, and increased blood sugar levels together with decreased insulin sensitivity can cause diabetes. Moreover, reduced microcirculation together with adrenaline supersensitivity in organs such as liver can occur.

== Examples ==
Examples include atipamezole, efaroxan, fipamezole, idazoxan, yohimbine, and rauwolscine, phentolamine.
