= CGP-39551 =

Competitive NMDA receptor antagonist

Names
- IUPAC name [(E)-4-amino-5-ethoxy-2-methyl-5-oxopent-2-enyl]phosphonic acid

Identifiers
CAS Number	127910-32-1
3D model (JSmol)	Interactive image
ChemSpider	4899607
EC Number	694-678-0
PubChem CID	6372334
- InChI: InChI=1S/C8H16NO5P/c1-3-14-8(10)7(9)4-6(2)5-15(11,12)13/h4,7H,3,5,9H2,1-2H3,(H2,11,12,13)/b6-4+ Key: OKDOWCKDTWNRCB-GQCTYLIASA-N
- SMILES: CCOC(=O)C(/C=C(\C)/CP(=O)(O)O)N

Properties
Chemical formula	C_{8}H_{16}NO_{5}P
Molar mass	237.192 g·mol^{−1}

Hazards
- GHS labelling
Pictograms	(GHS06: Toxic)
Signal word	Danger
Hazard statements	H301
Precautionary statements	P264, P270, P301+P316, P321, P330, P405, P501
- Except where otherwise noted, data are given for materials in their standard state (at 25 °C [77 °F], 100 kPa). Infobox references

CGP-39551 is a drug used in scientific research, it is investigated as an anti-convulsant.

== Mechanism of action ==
CGP-39551 and some related molecules are competitive antagonists of the N-methyl D-aspartate receptor, an excitatory receptor activated by glutamate.

== Potential ==
As other glutamate antagonists, CGP-39551 possesses anti-convulsant properties. It is able to suppress seizures caused by electroshock, with a duration of action superior to 24 hours.

It has also been shown to be able to block convulsions caused by vestibular stimulation.

Additionally, CGP-39551 appears to be better than some other NMDA blockers in terms of side effects, since the dose required for its anti-convulsant action does not have significant impact on memory and learning, unlike certain drugs with a similar mechanism of action such as Dizocilpine.
