= C12H16N2O2 =

The molecular formula C_{12}H_{16}N_{2}O_{2} (molar mass: 220.27 g/mol) may refer to:

- 2,5-Dimethoxy-4-cyanoamphetamine
- Eltoprazine, a serenic, or antiaggressive drug
- Methylenedioxybenzylpiperazine, a psychoactive drug
