= Chlorobenzaldehyde =

Chlorobenzaldehyde may refer to:

- 2-Chlorobenzaldehyde (o-chlorobenzaldehyde)
- 3-Chlorobenzaldehyde (m-chlorobenzaldehyde)
- 4-Chlorobenzaldehyde (p-chlorobenzaldehyde)
