= Sulindac =

Nonsteroidal anti-inflammatory drug

Clinical data
- Trade names: Clinoril
- AHFS/Drugs.com: Monograph
- MedlinePlus: a681037
- Pregnancy category: AU: C
- Routes of administration: By mouth
- ATC code: M01AB02 (WHO)

Legal status
- Legal status: AU: S4 (Prescription only); UK: POM (Prescription only); US: ℞-only

Pharmacokinetic data
- Bioavailability: Approximately 90% (Oral)
- Metabolism: ?
- Elimination half-life: 7.8 hours, metabolites up to 16.4 hours
- Excretion: Renal (50%) and fecal (25%)

Identifiers
- IUPAC name: {(1Z)-5-fluoro-2-methyl-1-[4-(methylsulfinyl)benzylidene]-1H-indene-3-yl}acetic acid
- CAS Number: 38194-50-2
- PubChem CID: 1548887
- IUPHAR/BPS: 5425
- DrugBank: DB00605
- ChemSpider: 1265915
- UNII: 184SNS8VUH
- KEGG: D00120
- ChEBI: CHEBI:9352
- ChEMBL: ChEMBL15770
- PDB ligand: SUZ (PDBe, RCSB PDB)
- CompTox Dashboard (EPA): DTXSID4023624
- ECHA InfoCard: 100.048.909

Chemical and physical data
- Formula: C_{20}H_{17}FO_{3}S
- Molar mass: 356.41 g·mol^{−1}
- 3D model (JSmol): Interactive image
- Melting point: 182 to 185 °C (360 to 365 °F) (decomp.)
- SMILES: CC1=C(CC(O)=O)C2=CC=CC=C2/C1=C\C3=CC=C(S(C)=O)C=C3
- InChI: InChI=1S/C20H17FO3S/c1-12-17(9-13-3-6-15(7-4-13)25(2)24)16-8-5-14(21)10-19(16)18(12)11-20(22)23/h3-10H,11H2,1-2H3,(H,22,23)/b17-9-; Key:MLKXDPUZXIRXEP-MFOYZWKCSA-N

Sulindac is a nonsteroidal anti-inflammatory drug (NSAID) of the arylalkanoic acid class that is marketed as Clinoril. Imbaral is another name for this drug. Its name is derived from sul(finyl)+ ind(ene)+ ac(etic acid) It was patented in 1969 and approved for medical use in 1976.

== Medical uses ==
Like other NSAIDs, it is useful in the treatment of acute or chronic inflammatory conditions. Sulindac is a prodrug, derived from sulfinylindene, that is converted in the body to the active NSAID. More specifically, the agent is converted by liver enzymes to a sulfide that is excreted in the bile and then reabsorbed from the intestine. This is thought to help maintain constant blood levels with reduced gastrointestinal side effects. Some studies have shown sulindac to be relatively less irritating to the stomach than other NSAIDs except for drugs of the COX-2 inhibitor class. The exact mechanism of its NSAID properties is unknown, but it is thought to act on enzymes COX-1 and COX-2, inhibiting prostaglandin synthesis.

Its usual dosage is 150-200 milligrams twice per day, with food. It should not be used by persons with a history of major allergic reactions (urticaria or anaphylaxis) to aspirin or other NSAIDs, and should be used with caution by persons having pre-existing peptic ulcer disease. Sulindac is much more likely than other NSAIDs to cause damage to the liver or pancreas, though it is less likely to cause kidney damage than other NSAIDs.

Sulindac seems to have a property, independent of COX-inhibition, of reducing the growth of polyps and precancerous lesions in the colon, especially in association with familial adenomatous polyposis, and may have other anti-cancer properties.

== Adverse effects ==
In October 2020, the U.S. Food and Drug Administration (FDA) required the prescribing information to be updated for all nonsteroidal anti-inflammatory medications to describe the risk of kidney problems in unborn babies that result in low amniotic fluid. They recommend avoiding NSAIDs in pregnant women at 20 weeks or later in pregnancy.

== Society and culture ==
=== Litigation ===
In September 2010, a federal jury in New Hampshire awarded $21 million to Karen Bartlett, a woman who developed Stevens–Johnson syndrome/toxic epidermal necrolysis as a result of taking a generic brand of sulindac manufactured by Mutual Pharmaceuticals for her shoulder pain. Bartlett sustained severe injuries including the loss of over 60% of her surface skin and permanent near-blindness. The case had been appealed to the United States Supreme Court, where the main issue was whether federal law preempts Bartlett's claim. On June 24, 2013, the Supreme Court ruled 5–4 in favor of Mutual Pharmaceuticals, throwing out the earlier $21 million jury verdict.

== Synthesis ==
Sulindac synthesis:

Reaction of p-fluorobenzyl chloride (1) with the anion of diethylmethyl malonate (2) gives intermediate diester (3), saponification of which and subsequent decarboxylation leads to 4. Alternatively it can be formed by Perkin reaction between p-fluorobenzaldehyde and propionic anhydride in the presence of NaOAc, followed by catalytic hydrogenation of the olefinic bond using a palladium on carbon catalyst.

Polyphosphoric acid (PPA) cyclization leads to 5-fluoro-2-methyl-3-indanone (4). A Reformatsky reaction with zinc amalgam and bromoacetic ester leads to carbinol (5), which is then dehydrated with tosic acid to indene 6. Alternatively, this step can be performed in a Knoevenagel condensation with cyanoacetic acid, which is then further decarboxylated.

The active methylene group is condensed with p-methylthiobenzaldehyde, using sodium methoxide as catalyst, and then saponified to give (7), which in turn is oxidized with sodium metaperiodate to give sulindac 8.
