= DMBMPP =

Chemical compound

Clinical data
- Other names: Juncosamine; 2-(2,5-Dimethoxy-4-bromobenzyl)-6-(2-methoxyphenyl)piperidine
- Drug class: Selective serotonin 5-HT_{2A} receptor agonist; Serotonergic psychedelic; Hallucinogen
- ATC code: None

Identifiers
- IUPAC name: 2-(2,5-dimethoxy-4-bromobenzyl)-6-(2-methoxyphenyl)piperidine
- CAS Number: 1391499-52-7
- PubChem CID: 72683323
- ChemSpider: 59718542
- UNII: 7H5TDL9Y6X

Chemical and physical data
- Formula: C_{21}H_{26}BrNO_{3}
- Molar mass: 420.347 g·mol^{−1}
- 3D model (JSmol): Interactive image
- SMILES: COC(C=C(Br)C(OC)=C1)=C1C[C@@H]2CCC[C@@H](C3=C(OC)C=CC=C3)N2
- InChI: InChI=1S/C21H26BrNO3/c1-24-19-10-5-4-8-16(19)18-9-6-7-15(23-18)11-14-12-21(26-3)17(22)13-20(14)25-2/h4-5,8,10,12-13,15,18,23H,6-7,9,11H2,1-3H3/t15-,18-/m0/s1; Key:KMVGLBONODPTDY-YJBOKZPZSA-N

DMBMPP, also known as juncosamine or as 2-(2,5-dimethoxy-4-bromobenzyl)-6-(2-methoxyphenyl)piperidine, is a highly selective serotonin 5-HT_{2A} receptor agonist and 2-benzylpiperidine analogue of the serotonergic psychedelic 25B-NBOMe which is used in scientific research.

== Pharmacology ==
=== Pharmacodynamics ===
The (S,S)-isomer ((2S,6S)-DMBMPP) is the most selective agonist for the human serotonin 5-HT_{2A} receptor yet discovered, with a affinity (K_{i}) of 2.5 nM at the human serotonin 5-HT_{2A} receptor and with 124-fold selectivity for the serotonin 5-HT_{2A} receptor over the structurally similar serotonin 5-HT_{2C} receptor. Together with 25CN-NBOH, (2S,6S)-DMBMPP is the only known 5-HT_{2A} agonist to exhibit this level of selectivity. In contrast to the case of the serotonin 5-HT_{2A} receptor, no functional data has been reported for DMBMPP at the serotonin 5-HT_{2C} receptor as of 2023.

Ligand	K_{i} ± SEM (nM)	K_{i} ± SEM (nM)	K_{i} ± SEM (nM)
	[^{3}H] ketanserin	[^{3}H] mesulergine	fold selectivity
	h5-HT_{2A}	h5-HT_{2C}	h5-HT_{2C}/h5-HT_{2A}
2C-B	6.0 ± 0.3	23.8 ± 2.6	9.5
25B-NBOMe	0.19 ± 0.01	4.0 ± 0.4	21
(±)-DMBMPP	5.3 ± 0.3	520 ± 22	98
(S,S)-(−)-DMBMPP	2.5 ± 0.1	310 ± 42	124
(R,R)-(+)-DMBMPP	2,100 ± 171	28,600 ± 4700	27

(S,S)-DMBMPP was assessed and found to fully substitute for the psychedelic drug LSD in rodent drug discrimination tests. As such, DMBMPP may be expected to have hallucinogenic effects in humans.

Despite its uniquely high selectivity for the serotonin 5-HT_{2A} receptor, it has been said that DMBMPP is not widely used as a pharmacological tool in scientific research, presumably due to its chemical synthesis being relatively inaccessible. Consequently, 25CN-NBOH, another highly selective serotonin 5-HT_{2A} receptor agonist, has been proposed as an alternative to DMBMPP for use in scientific research. DMBMPP and 25CN-NBOH are the two most selective serotonin 5-HT_{2A} receptor agonists known as of 2020.

== Chemistry ==
DMBMPP, also known as 2-(2,5-dimethoxy-4-bromobenzyl)-6-(2-methoxyphenyl)piperidine, is a cyclized phenethylamine, 2C, and NBOMe derivative of 2C-B and 25B-NBOMe. It differs from 25B-NBOMe by incorporating the amine within a piperidine ring, making for a more conformationally restrained, rigid molecular structure than that of the open-chain 25B-NBOMe. The presence of the piperidine ring introduces two stereocenters, thus, four stereoisomers of this compound can be made.

== History ==
DMBMPP was first described in the scientific literature by Jose Juncosa of the lab of David E. Nichols at Purdue University in 2011.

== Society and culture ==
=== Legal status ===
==== Canada ====
DMBMPP is not an explicitly controlled substance in Canada as of 2025. However, it might be covered under phenethylamine and amphetamine blanket-ban language, although this is unclear due to its nature as a cyclized phenethylamine.

==== United States ====
DMBMPP is not an explicitly controlled substance in the United States. However, it could be considered a controlled substance under the Federal Analogue Act if intended for human consumption.

== See also ==
- Cyclized phenethylamine
- Substituted 2-benzylpiperidine
- 25CN-NBOH
- DOB-NBOMe
- Z3517967757
- 2C-B-3PIP
- LPH-5
- TGF-8027
