= LPH-5 =

LPH-5 may refer to:

- LPH-5, a designation for the ship USS Princeton (CV-37)
- LPH-5 (drug), a psychedelic drug
