= 25CN-NBOMe =

Chemical compound

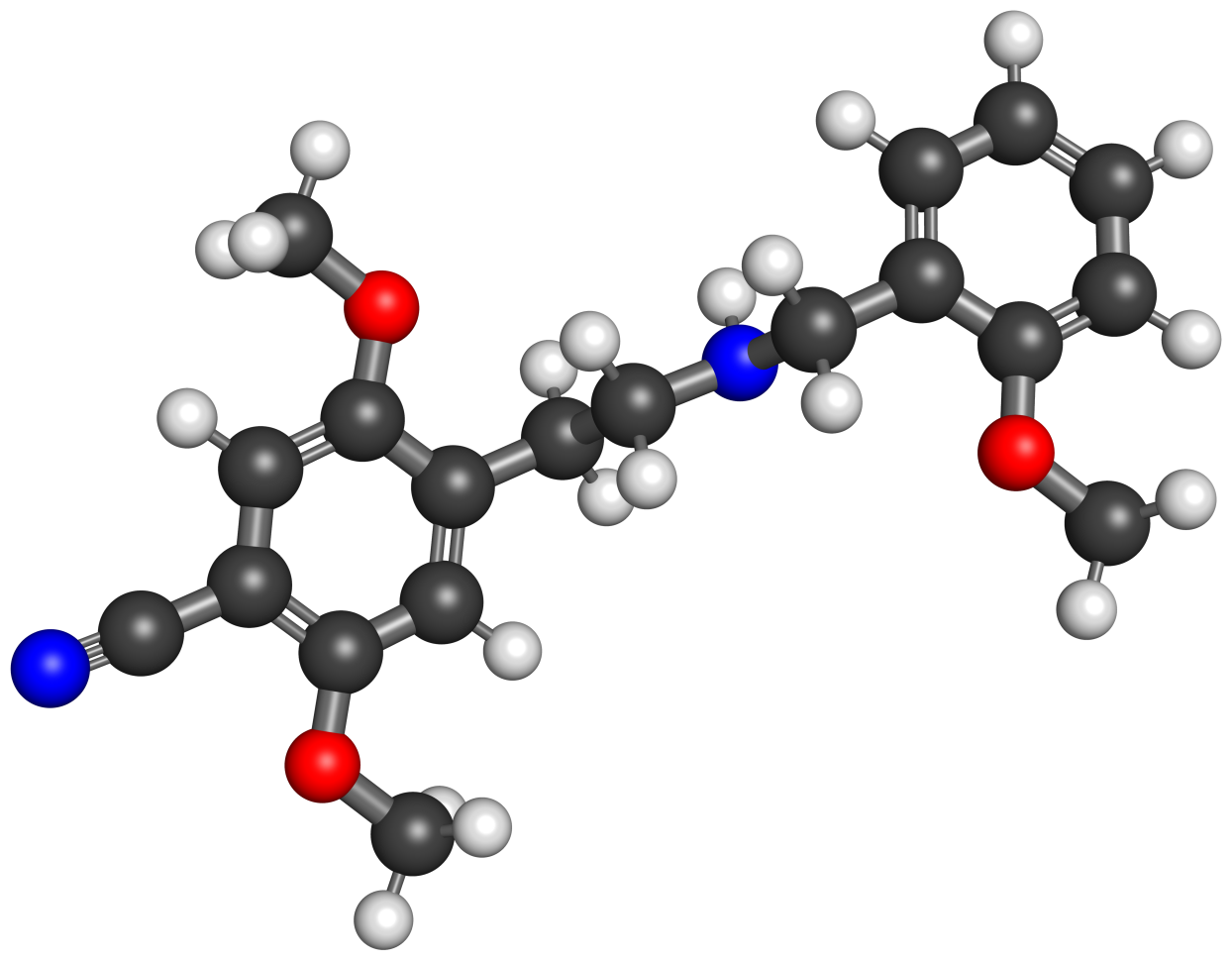

Clinical data
- Other names: 2C-CN-NBOMe; NBOMe-2C-CN
- Drug class: Serotonin 5-HT_{2} receptor agonist

Identifiers
- IUPAC name: 2,5-Dimethoxy-4-(2-(2-methoxybenzylamino)ethyl)benzonitrile
- CAS Number: 1354632-16-8
- PubChem CID: 152743520
- ChemSpider: 58191430
- UNII: 2B3AN5ZD3X

Chemical and physical data
- Formula: C_{19}H_{22}N_{2}O_{3}
- Molar mass: 326.396 g·mol^{−1}
- 3D model (JSmol): Interactive image
- SMILES: N#CC1=CC(OC)=C(CCNCC2=C(OC)C=CC=C2)C=C1OC
- InChI: InChI=1S/C19H22N2O3/c1-22-17-7-5-4-6-15(17)13-21-9-8-14-10-19(24-3)16(12-20)11-18(14)23-2/h4-7,10-11,21H,8-9,13H2,1-3H3; Key:QBJWOIWLBRLGKZ-UHFFFAOYSA-N

25CN-NBOMe, also known as 2C-CN-NBOMe or NBOMe-2C-CN, is a derivative of the phenethylamine 2C-CN. It acts in a similar manner to related compounds such as 25I-NBOMe, which are potent agonists at the serotonin 5-HT_{2A} receptor.

== Pharmacology ==
=== Pharmacodynamics ===
25CN-NBOMe activities
Target	Affinity (K_{i}, nM)
5-HT_{1A}	ND
5-HT_{1B}	ND
5-HT_{1D}	ND
5-HT_{1E}	ND
5-HT_{1F}	ND
5-HT_{2A}	1.8–4.6 (K_{i}); 0.40–6.7 (EC_{50}); 77–148% (E_{max})
5-HT_{2B}	21–47 (K_{i}); 12 (EC_{50}); 79% (E_{max})
5-HT_{2C}	8–180 (K_{i}); 9.3–230 (EC_{50}); 91–101% (E_{max})
5-HT_{3}	ND
5-HT_{4}	ND
5-HT_{5A}	ND
5-HT_{6}	145
5-HT_{7}	ND
α_{1A}–α_{1D}	ND
α_{2A}–α_{2C}	ND
β_{1}–β_{3}	ND
D_{1}–D_{5}	ND
H_{1}–H_{4}	ND
M_{1}–M_{5}	ND
I_{1}	ND
σ_{1}, σ_{2}	ND
ORs	ND
TAAR1	ND
SERT	ND (K_{i}); ND (IC_{50}); ND (EC_{50})
NET	ND (K_{i}); ND (IC_{50}); ND (EC_{50})
DAT	ND (K_{i}); ND (IC_{50}); ND (EC_{50})
Notes: The smaller the value, the more avidly the drug binds to the site. All proteins are human unless otherwise specified. Refs:

25CN-NBOMe acts as a potent and selective agonist of the serotonin 5-HT_{2A} receptor. To a lesser extent, it also acts as an agonist of the serotonin 5-HT_{2B} and 5-HT_{2C} receptors.

== History ==
25CN-NBOMe was first described in the scientific literature by 2010.

== Society and culture ==
=== Legal status ===
==== Canada ====
25CN-NBOMe is a controlled substance in Canada under phenethylamine blanket-ban language.

==== United Kingdom ====
This substance is a Class A drug in the United Kingdom as a result of the N-benzylphenethylamine catch-all clause in the Misuse of Drugs Act 1971.

== See also ==
- 25-NB
- 2C-CN
- 25CN-NBOH
