= Idazoxan =

Chemical compound

Clinical data
- Routes of administration: By mouth
- ATC code: none

Legal status
- Legal status: In general: uncontrolled

Identifiers
- IUPAC name: (±)-2-(2,3-dihydro-1,4-benzodioxin-2-yl)-4,5-dihydro-1H-imidazole
- CAS Number: 79944-58-4
- PubChem CID: 54459
- ChemSpider: 49184
- UNII: Y310PA316B
- ChEMBL: ChEMBL10316
- CompTox Dashboard (EPA): DTXSID6045161

Chemical and physical data
- Formula: C_{11}H_{12}N_{2}O_{2}
- Molar mass: 204.229 g·mol^{−1}
- 3D model (JSmol): Interactive image
- Chirality: Racemic mixture
- SMILES: C1CN=C(N1)C2COC3=CC=CC=C3O2
- InChI: InChI=1S/C11H12N2O2/c1-2-4-9-8(3-1)14-7-10(15-9)11-12-5-6-13-11/h1-4,10H,5-7H2,(H,12,13); Key:HPMRFMKYPGXPEP-UHFFFAOYSA-N

Idazoxan (INN) is a drug which is used in scientific research. It acts as both a selective α_{2}-adrenergic receptor antagonist, and an antagonist for the imidazoline receptor. Idazoxan has been under investigation as an antidepressant, but it did not reach the market as such. More recently, it is under investigation as an adjunctive treatment in schizophrenia. Due to its α_{2} receptor antagonism, it is capable of enhancing therapeutic effects of antipsychotics, possibly by enhancing dopamine neurotransmission in the prefrontal cortex of the brain, a brain area thought to be involved in the pathogenesis of schizophrenia.

== Research ==
=== Alzheimer's disease ===
Mice treated with idazoxan, which blocks the α_{2A}-adrenergic receptor, behaved similarly to control animals despite still having amyloid-beta plaques in the brain, as a proof-of-concept experiment that dramatically reduced Alzheimer's disease pathology and symptoms in two mouse models, potentially offering an immediate treatment for this devastating disease.

== Synthesis ==
Note that the literature method claims that the old original patented procedure gives a different reaction product formed through a rearrangement.

Synthesis: Old Patent: New Patent:

The reaction of catechol (1) with 2-Chloroacrylonitrile [920-37-6] (2) gives 2-cyano-1,4-benzodioxan [1008-92-0] (3). Pinner reaction with alcoholic hydrogen chloride leads to the iminoether, (4). Treatment with ethylenediamine [107-15-3] (5) gives the imidazoline ring affording Idazoxin (6).

== Veterinary use ==
Idazoxan has been used to reverse xylazine in cattle and sheep but it is rarely used in practice with other α_{2}-adrenergic receptor antagonists such as yohimbine and atipamezole being used instead.

== See also ==
- Imiloxan
- Efaroxan
- Fluparoxan
- F-14413
