= Fluparoxan =

Chemical compound

Clinical data
- Other names: (+/-)-(trans)-5-fluoro-2,3,3a,9a-tetrahydro-1H-[1,4]benzodioxino[2,3-c]pyrrole hydrochloride hemihydrate
- Routes of administration: Oral

Pharmacokinetic data
- Bioavailability: 85% oral from tablet formulation
- Metabolism: Greater than 90% excreted as (sulphamic acid and carbamoyI glucuronide conjugates)
- Elimination half-life: 6 hours
- Excretion: Renal

Identifiers
- IUPAC name: (3aR,9aR)-rel-5-fluoro-2,3,3a,9a-tetrahydro-1H-[1,4]benzodioxino[2,3-c]pyrrole hydrochloride hydrate (2:2:1)
- CAS Number: (+/-): 101389-86-0 101389-87-1 ((+/-)-hydrochloride); (+/-)-hydrochloride hemihydrate: 139679-54-2
- PubChem CID: (+/-): 72036
- ChemSpider: (+/-): 65029
- UNII: (+/-): 1N6WYI0KA0; (+/-)-hydrochloride hemihydrate: O53Z6W28DK
- ChEMBL: (+/-): ChEMBL1765294
- CompTox Dashboard (EPA): (+/-): DTXSID80146995

Chemical and physical data
- Formula: C_{10}H_{12}ClFNO_{2.5}
- Molar mass: 240.66 g·mol^{−1}
- 3D model (JSmol): (+/-): Interactive image
- SMILES: (+/-): C1[C@H]2[C@H](CN1)OC3=C(O2)C=CC=C3F

Fluparoxan (developmental code name GR50360A) is a potent α_{2}-adrenergic receptor antagonist (pK_{B} = 7.9) with excellent selectivity for this receptor over the α_{1}-adrenergic receptor (2,630-fold), and is the only well-studied α_{2}-adrenergic receptor antagonist in its structural family which does not antagonize any variant of the imidazoline receptor. It was shown to possess central α_{2}-adrenoceptor antagonist activity after oral doses in man and was patented as an antidepressant by Glaxo in the early 1980s, but its development was discontinued when the compound failed to show a clear clinical advantage over existing therapies.

== Pharmacology ==
=== Pharmacodynamics ===
Fluparoxan is a very selective α_{2}-adrenergic blocker, that readily crosses the blood–brain barrier. Blockade of α_{2}-adrenoreceptors, particularly presynaptic autoreceptors in noradrenergic neurons, by fluparoxan produces an increase in the synaptic concentrations of noradrenaline by blocking the autoinhibitory feedback mechanism. This release of noradrenaline has a potential value in the treatment of disorders which are associated with a deficiency of noradrenaline at postsynaptic adrenoreceptors, such as depression, the early features of Alzheimer's disease and schizophrenia, as well as other neurodevelopmental disorders associated with cognitive impairment. Fluparoxan also exhibits no anticholinergic, antidopaminergic, α_{1}-adrenergic, β-adrenergic, muscarinic, or 5-HT_{1} receptor-blocking effects.

Fluparoxan showed α_{2}-adrenoceptors antagonist activity in vivo in several animal species. In the conscious mouse, fluparoxan was effective by the oral route in preventing clonidine-induced hypothermia and antinociception. In the rat, the marked impairment of rotarod performance was prevented dose-dependently by fluparoxan. Fluparoxan, given orally, prevented agonist UK-14304 induced sedation and bradycardia in a dose-related fashion in the dog. Fluparoxan has been shown to possess central α_{2}-adrenoceptor antagonist activity after both single and repeated oral doses in man, significantly attenuating all responses to the agonist clonidine (growth hormone secretion, bradycardia, hypotension, xerostomia) apart from the measures of sedation.

Fluparoxan has shown positive effects in the treatment of cognitive dysfunction in schizophrenia patients when orally dosed with fluparoxan. Ia has also shown positive effects in ttment of central neurodegenerative disorders in models of Alzheimer's disease, where it prevented age-related decline in spatial working memory in transgenic mice. It had Ihowever, no effect in other memory tasks, such as object recognition or the Morris water maze, and occurred in the absence of obvious concomitant change in pathology such as β-amyloid plaque load and astrocytosis.

The individual chiral isomers 7 (+) 3aR,9aR and 8 (-) 3aS,9aS of fluparoxan both had comparable levels of α_{2}-adrenoceptors antagonist potency and α_{2}/α_{1} selectivity to racemic fluparoxan 6 (±) rel 3aR,9aR in vitro and a similar potency in reversing the hypothermia induced in mice by clonidine in vivo.

Racemic Fluparoxan as HCl hemi-hydrate, (+)Enantiomer HCl and (-)EnantiomerHCl

Adrenoceptors antagonist potency of racemic fluparoxan and enantiomers in vitro and in vivo
Compound as HCl	α_{2}-Adrenoceptors Vas deferens UK14304	α_{1}-Adrenoceptors Anococcygeus muscle Phenylephrine	Hypothermia Clonidine Mice po	Optical Rotation	Melting Point
Measurement	pK_{B}	pK_{B}	ED_{50}mg/kg	[α]^{20-23}_{D°}	mp^{°}C
6 (+/-) rel 3aR,9aR	7.86	5.00	0.66	0	245
7 (+) 3aR,9aR	7.88	4.47	0.73	+159.6	235-236
8 (-) 3aS,9aS	7.68	4.95	0.46	-159.4	238-240

=== Pharmacokinetics ===
Fluparoxan has rat and human protein binding of 81-92% and 95% respectively. Fluparoxan shows high in vitro permeability in MCDK (Papp nm/s =2500) and Caco-2 (Papp nm/s =2000) cells, which correlates well with the known high oral intestinal absorption (100%) in humans. Fluparoxan is well absorbed following oral dosing in all animals. Clearance was largely metabolic, with both oral and intravenous doses being excreted mainly via the urine (> 90%, of administered dose), chiefly as phase II metabolites (sulphamic acid and carbamoyl glucuronide conjugates). Fluparoxan has high oral bioavailability (100%) and a long duration of action (2hr) in the rat, which accounts for the similar potency seen in both the oral and intravenous routes of administration in this species. The excellent pharmacokinetics exhibited by fluparoxan in animals also translated into man, where it has a superior bioavailability (97%) and longer duration of action (6-7hrs).

==== Metabolism ====
Fluparoxan was not metabolized by human cytochrome P450 enzymes CYP1A and CYP2A, was found not to be a mutagen in cultured human peripheral lymphocytes and did not cause gene mutation when administered to Chinese hamster fibroblasts in culture. No mutagenic potential was identified in microbiological mutagenicity tests, including a fluctuation test with S9 activation. No hydroxylated metabolites were identified after incubation with rat liver microsomes (S9) or in rat urine following oral dosing. The compound was well tolerated on repeat oral administration to rat (≤ 200 mg /kg/day) and dog (≤ 80 mg/kg/day) for 12 months.

== Chemistry ==
Racemic (±) fluparoxan 6 is a white crystalline powder as the hydrochloride hemihydrate m.p. 245 °C. It is a mixture of two enantiomers and is moderately lipophilic (log P = 1.2), with good solubility 80 mg/mL in water at 25 °C. The compound is very stable in the solid state, its bioavailability from tablet formulation is 85% and absorption is rapid.

=== Synthesis ===
Racemic (±) fluparoxan 6 was first synthesised by a convergent route, which involved converting the bis-benzyl ether of cis-butene-l,4-diol 1 into its epoxide 2 followed by acid catalyzed ring opening to a racemic-diol which was then converted into the racemic trans bis-tosylate 3. Coupling 3-fluorocatechol 4 with the racemic trans bis-tosylate 3 in the presence base gave on deprotection the benzodioxan diol 5 which was converted to racemic 6 via coupling its bis-mesylate to benzylamine followed by deprotection.

The Convergent Synthesis of Fluparoxan

The individual chiral isomers (+) 7 and (-) 8 of fluparoxan were originally prepared from the (+) and (-) isomers of diethyl tartrate via the corresponding chiral trans bis-tosylates in a convergent route similar to that shown in the synthesis of racemic fluparoxan.

== History ==
Although fluparoxan has been shown to possess central α_{2}-adrenoceptor antagonist activity after both single and repeated oral doses in man, clinical evaluation in depression and its development for the treatment of male sexual dysfunction was discontinued in the early 1990s, when the compound failed to show a clear clinical advantage over existing therapies. The same is true for other α_{2}-adrenoceptor antagonists in depression and it is now generally agreed that the original hypothesis, of blocking α_{2}-presynaptic adrenoceptors in order to increase brain levels of noradrenalin, is insufficient as a neurobiological basis for depressive disorders, with the true picture likely to be much more complex and heterogeneous, involving both monoaminergic and non-monoaminergic players. In contrast, however, recent interest in fluparoxan has increased due to its positive effects in treating cognitive dysfunction in central neurodegenerative diseases.

== See also ==
- Efaroxan
- Idazoxan
