= TGF-8027 =

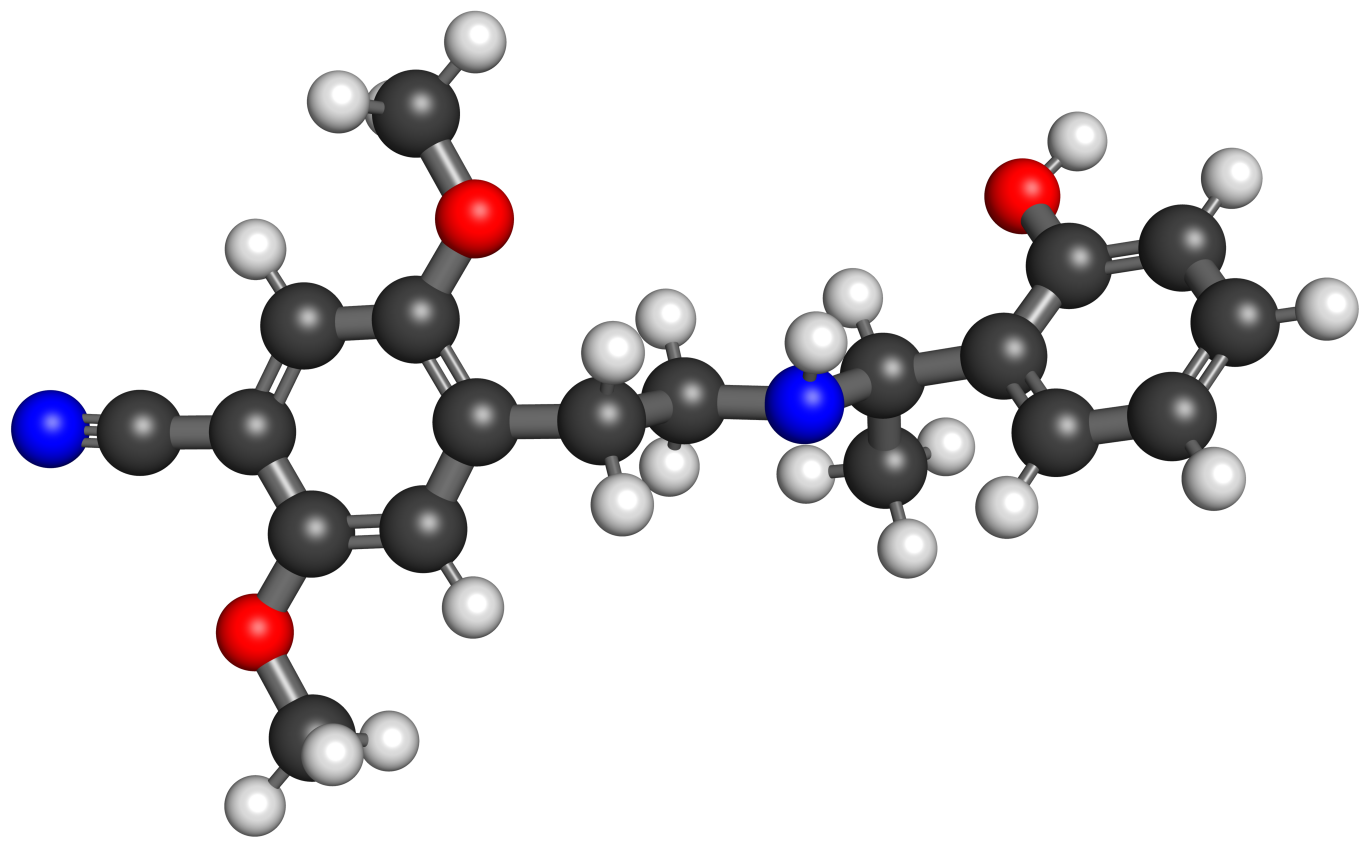

Clinical data
- Other names: TGF8027; TGF-8-027; N-[1-(2-Hydroxyphenyl)ethyl]-2,5-dimethoxy-4-cyanophenethylamine
- Drug class: Selective serotonin 5-HT_{2A} receptor agonist; Serotonergic psychedelic; Hallucinogen
- ATC code: None

Chemical and physical data
- Formula: C_{19}H_{22}N_{2}O_{3}
- Molar mass: 326.396 g·mol^{−1}
- 3D model (JSmol): Interactive image
- SMILES: C1=C(C#N)C(OC)=CC(CCN([H])C(C)C2=CC=CC=C2O[H])=C1OC
- InChI: InChI=1S/C19H22N2O3/c1-13(16-6-4-5-7-17(16)22)21-9-8-14-10-19(24-3)15(12-20)11-18(14)23-2/h4-7,10-11,13,21-22H,8-9H2,1-3H3; Key:YGVDYCKUVCKBFS-UHFFFAOYSA-N

TGF-8027, or TGF-8-027, also known as N-[1-(2-hydroxyphenyl)ethyl]-2,5-dimethoxy-4-cyanophenethylamine, is a highly selective serotonin 5-HT_{2A} receptor agonist and putative serotonergic psychedelic of the phenethylamine, 2C, and 25-NB (NBOH) families. It is one of the most selective serotonin 5-HT_{2A} receptor agonists known and shows much greater selectivity than earlier agents like 25CN-NBOH, DMBMPP, and LPH-5. The drug produces psychedelic-like effects in rodents and hence may be hallucinogenic in humans. TGF-8027 was first described in the literature in 2025.

== Pharmacology ==
=== Pharmacodynamics ===
TGF-8027 acts as a highly selective serotonin 5-HT_{2A} receptor full agonist. Its affinities (K_{i}) were 7.4 nM at the serotonin 5-HT_{2A} receptor, 390 nM at the serotonin 5-HT_{2B} receptor, and 1,100 nM at the serotonin 5-HT_{2C} receptor. The drug's EC_{50} and E_{max} values in terms of G_{q} dissociation were 3.3 nM (91%) at the human serotonin 5-HT_{2A} receptor, 7,600 nM (45%) at the human serotonin 5-HT_{2B} receptor, and 160 nM (123%) at the human serotonin 5-HT_{2C} receptor. It was also assessed at these receptors with other assays. In addition, TGF-8027 was screened at a large panel of other targets, including receptors and transporters, and showed relatively little affinity at these sites.

With regard to selectivity for the human serotonin 5-HT_{2A} receptor over the human serotonin 5-HT_{2C} receptor, TGF-8027 showed 149-fold selectivity in terms of affinity, 48.5-fold selectivity in terms of G_{q} dissociation, 84.5-fold selectivity in terms of calcium flux, and 2,450-fold selectivity in terms of IP1 accumulation. It is far more selective as an agonist of the serotonin 5-HT_{2A} receptor over the serotonin 5-HT_{2C} receptor than previous selective serotonin 5-HT_{2A} receptor agonists such as 25CN-NBOH, DMBMPP, and rac-LPH-5 (fold selectivity for G_{q} dissociation in the same study of 10.0, 13.5, and 4.4, respectively). Previous research had not rigorously assessed the selectivity of these earlier compounds via employment of multiple selectivity assays.

TGF-8027 was less selective for the mouse serotonin 5-HT_{2A} receptor over the mouse serotonin 5-HT_{2C} receptor, but still showed about 15-fold selectivity for the former over the latter in terms of G_{q} dissociation. In accordance with its serotonin 5-HT_{2A} receptor activation, the drug robustly induces the head-twitch response, a behavioral proxy of psychedelic effects, in mice. As such, it would be expected to produce psychedelic effects in humans.

The compound is a racemic mixture of (+)- and (–)-enantiomers, with the (–)-enantiomer being a more potent serotonin 5-HT_{2A} receptor agonist but the (+)-enantiomer being more selective for activation of the serotonin 5-HT_{2A} receptor over the serotonin 5-HT_{2C} receptor.

== Chemistry ==
TGF-8027, also known as N-[1-(2-hydroxyphenyl)ethyl]-2,5-dimethoxy-4-cyanophenethylamine, is a substituted phenethylamine and a 2C and 25-NB (NBOH) derivative. It is specifically the derivative of 25CN-NBOH in which the benzyl group has been α-methylated. The compound is a racemic mixture of (+)- and (–)-enantiomers. A series of other analogues of TGF-8027 have also been reported, some of which show further improved serotonin 5-HT_{2A} receptor selectivity relative to TGF-8027 itself.

== History ==
TGF-8027 was first described in the scientific literature by John McCorvy's lab and colleagues in 2025. The group also included Adam Halberstadt. The serotonin 5-HT_{2A} and 5-HT_{2C} receptors show considerable homology, which has made development of selective serotonin 5-HT_{2A} receptor agonists difficult. TGF-8027 was discovered via a rational structure-guided design that took advantage of an identified single-residue difference between the serotonin 5-HT_{2A} receptor and the serotonin 5-HT_{2C} receptor in transmembrane 2 (TM2) of the extended binding pocket. The group also reported a series of other selective serotonin 5-HT_{2A} receptor agonists in addition to TGF-8027, some of which showed even further improved selectivity. TGF-8027 was selected for more in-depth characterization over other compounds, for instance in the head-twitch response assay, because it showed among the highest selectivity and potency at the mouse serotonin 5-HT_{2A} receptor in addition to the human serotonin 5-HT_{2A} receptor.

== Society and culture ==
=== Legal status ===
==== Canada ====
TGF-8027 may be a controlled substance in Canada under phenethylamine blanket-ban language.

==== United States ====
TGF-8027 is not an explicitly controlled substance in the United States. However, it could be considered a controlled substance under the Federal Analogue Act if intended for human consumption.

== See also ==
- 25-NB
- 25CN-NBOH
- 2C-CN
- DOCN
