= F-14413 =

Clinical data
- Other names: F14413; 5-Fluoro-methoxyidazoxan
- Routes of administration: Unspecified
- Drug class: α_{2}-Adrenergic receptor antagonist or inverse agonist
- ATC code: None

Identifiers
- IUPAC name: 2-[(2S)-5-fluoro-2-methoxy-3H-1,4-benzodioxin-2-yl]-4,5-dihydro-1H-imidazole
- PubChem CID: 11709050
- ChemSpider: 9883772

Chemical and physical data
- Formula: C_{12}H_{13}FN_{2}O_{3}
- Molar mass: 252.245 g·mol^{−1}
- 3D model (JSmol): Interactive image
- SMILES: CO[C@@]1(COC2=C(O1)C=CC=C2F)C3=NCCN3
- InChI: InChI=1S/C12H13FN2O3/c1-16-12(11-14-5-6-15-11)7-17-10-8(13)3-2-4-9(10)18-12/h2-4H,5-7H2,1H3,(H,14,15)/t12-/m1/s1; Key:YGKDKIOEXKAIES-GFCCVEGCSA-N

F-14413, also known as 5-fluoro-methoxyidazoxan, is an α_{2}-adrenergic receptor antagonist or inverse agonist which was under development for the treatment of Alzheimer's disease and Parkinson's disease in France but was never marketed. It is a derivative of idazoxan. The drug's route of administration was unspecified. It is said to be potent and highly selective as an α_{2}-adrenergic receptor modulator. F-14413 was under development by Pierre Fabre. It reached the preclinical research stage of development prior to its discontinuation. F-14413 was first described in the scientific literature by 2001, while its latest developmental update was in 2003.

== See also ==
- List of investigational Parkinson's disease drugs
