= Fluorobenzaldehyde =

Group of chemical compounds

Fluorobenzaldehyde is a group of three constitutional isomers of fluorinated benzaldehyde.

== Properties ==
The isomers differ in the location of the fluorine, but they have the same chemical formulas.

Fluorobenzaldehyde isomers
Name	o-Fluorobenzaldehyde	m-Fluorobenzaldehyde	p-Fluorobenzaldehyde
Structure
Systematic name	2-Fluorobenzaldehyde	3-Fluorobenzaldehyde	4-Fluorobenzaldehyde
Molecular formula	C_{7}H_{5}FO	C_{7}H_{5}FO	C_{7}H_{5}FO
Molar mass	124.11 g/mol	124.11 g/mol	124.11 g/mol
CAS number	446-52-6	456-48-4	459-57-4
EC number	207-171-2	207-266-9	459-57-4
Properties
Melting point	−44.5 °C		−10 °C
Boiling point	175 °C	173 °C	181 °C
Flash point	55 °C	56 °C	56 °C
Density	1.18 g/cm^{3}	1.174 g/cm^{3}	1.175 g/cm^{3}

== Preparation ==
The 4-fluorobenzaldehyde isomer can be produced by a halogen-exchange reaction with 4-chlorobenzaldehyde.

== Uses ==
Fluorobenzaldehyde can be used as a synthetic intermediate because the fluorine can be replaced via oxidation reaction. Due to the aldehyde group, the fluorobenzaldehydes can be used to make a variety of schiff base compounds through a condensation reaction, some of which have antimicrobial properties.

4'-Fluorobenzaldehyde is used to make: sulindac, Synthetic raspberry (Polish), FGIN-127, rosuvastatin, GF 73 (Paroxetine PLE method), & rivoglitazone & mosapride.

3'-Fluorobenzaldehyde is used to make: cinflumide, DFB [15332-10-2]

2'-Fluorobenzaldehyde is used to make: efaroxan
