= 2,5-Dimethoxy-4-nitroamphetamine =

DON

Clinical data
- Other names: DON; 2,5-Dimethoxy-4-nitroamphetamine; 4-Nitro-2,5-dimethoxyamphetamine
- Routes of administration: Oral
- Drug class: Serotonin 5-HT_{2} receptor agonist; Serotonin 5-HT_{2A} receptor agonist; Serotonergic psychedelic; Hallucinogen; Stimulant
- ATC code: None

Pharmacokinetic data
- Onset of action: ≥1 hour
- Duration of action: 8–15 hours

Identifiers
- IUPAC name: 1-(2,5-dimethoxy-4-nitrophenyl)propan-2-amine
- CAS Number: 67460-68-8
- PubChem CID: 105432
- ChemSpider: 95083
- UNII: 3FIV60666J
- ChEMBL: ChEMBL8301
- CompTox Dashboard (EPA): DTXSID00874243

Chemical and physical data
- Formula: C_{11}H_{16}N_{2}O_{4}
- Molar mass: 240.259 g·mol^{−1}
- 3D model (JSmol): Interactive image
- Melting point: 206 to 207 °C (403 to 405 °F) (hydrochloride); 231-232 °C ((R)-isomer)
- SMILES: COc1cc(c(cc1CC(C)N)OC)N(=O)=O
- InChI: InChI=1S/C11H16N2O4/c1-7(12)4-8-5-11(17-3)9(13(14)15)6-10(8)16-2/h5-7H,4,12H2,1-3H3; Key:JQJRESSXOVAECC-UHFFFAOYSA-N

2,5-Dimethoxy-4-nitroamphetamine (DON) is a psychedelic drug of the phenethylamine, amphetamine, and DOx families. Unlike related drugs like DOB, it produces both pronounced hallucinogenic and amphetamine-like stimulant effects. The drug is taken orally.

It acts as a serotonin 5-HT_{2} receptor agonist, including of the serotonin 5-HT_{2A} receptor. The drug produces psychedelic-like effects in animals.

DON was first described in the scientific literature by Ronald Coutts and Jerry Malicky by 1973. Its properties and effects in humans were described by Juan Sebastian Gomez-Jeria and colleagues in the mid-1980s. Subsequently, the drug was reviewed by Alexander Shulgin in his 1991 book PiHKAL (Phenethylamines I Have Known and Loved). DON was encountered as a novel designer drug in Japan by the late 2000s.

== Use and effects ==
In his book PiHKAL (Phenethylamines I Have Known and Loved), Alexander Shulgin lists DON's dose as 3.0 to 4.5 mg orally and its duration as 8 to 15 hours. The 3 mg dose produced mostly stimulant-like effects while the 4.5 mg dose produced full hallucinogenic effects. Its onset was a little over 1 hour. The duration of the psychedelic effects was about 8 hours and the duration of the stimulation was at least 14 hours, although in some people the psychedelic effects were longer-lasting.

The drug's effects were reported to include enhanced color perception, intense visual hallucinations, some auditory distortion, strong amphetamine-like stimulation, a frequent desire for physical activity, anxiety, stomach cramps, slight hypothermia, and little or no physical malaise. It was said to have very similar qualitative effects to those of DOB except for its additional strong stimulant component. Due to its pronounced stimulant effects, it was hypothesized that DON might have a reduced likelihood of potentially unpleasant and insightful experiences and thus might have more recreational potential.

== Pharmacology ==
=== Pharmacodynamics ===
DON acts as a serotonin 5-HT_{2A} and 5-HT_{2C} receptor partial agonist, albeit with far lower potency and efficacy than other DOx drugs. It is also a serotonin 5-HT_{2B} receptor partial agonist. Earlier studies have also reported its affinities at serotonin receptors, including the serotonin 5-HT_{2} and 5-HT_{1} receptors. It is inactive as a monoamine oxidase inhibitor (MAOI). The drug produces the head-twitch response, a behavioral proxy of psychedelic-like effects, in rodents. It shows similar potency and efficacy as DOM in this assay.

== Chemistry ==
DON is in a class of compounds commonly known as α-methyl phenethylamines, or amphetamines and the full chemical name is 1-(2,5-dimethoxy-4-nitrophenyl)propan-2-amine. It has a stereocenter.

=== Properties ===
DON is a relatively hydrophilic compound.

=== Synthesis ===
The chemical synthesis of DON has been described.

=== Analogues ===
Analogues of DON include 2C-N, 2C-CN, and other DOx drugs like DOM and DOB, among others.

== History ==
DON was first described in the scientific literature by Ronald Coutts and Jerry Malicky by 1973. Its properties and effects in humans were described by Juan Sebastian Gomez-Jeria and colleagues in 1986 and 1987. Subsequently, the drug was reviewed by Alexander Shulgin in his 1991 book PiHKAL (Phenethylamines I Have Known and Loved). DON was encountered as a novel designer drug in Japan by 2008 or 2009.

== Society and culture ==
=== Legal status ===
==== Canada ====
DON is a controlled substance in Canada under phenethylamine blanket-ban language.

==== United Kingdom ====
DON is listed as a Class A drug in the Drugs controlled by the UK Misuse of Drugs Act after the table of contents of PiHKAL and TiHKAL were added to the schedules.

==== United States ====
DON is not an explicitly controlled substance in the United States. However, because of its close similarity in structure and effects to DOM and DOB, possession and sale of DON may be subject to prosecution under the Federal Analog Act.

== See also ==
- DOx (psychedelics)
- Stimulant § Serotonin 5-HT_{2A} receptor agonists
- Motivation-enhancing drug § Serotonin 5-HT_{2A} receptor agonists
