= 2-Chloro-6-fluorotoluene =

- Skeletal formula of 2-chloro-6-fluorotoluene

Names
- Preferred IUPAC name 1-Chloro-3-fluoro-2-methylbenzene

Identifiers
CAS Number	443-83-4
3D model (JSmol)	Interactive image
ChemSpider	9545
ECHA InfoCard	100.006.494
EC Number	207-141-9
PubChem CID	9933
UNII	FR97UNN987
CompTox Dashboard (EPA)	DTXSID1059997
- InChI: InChI=1S/C7H6ClF/c1-5-6(8)3-2-4-7(5)9/h2-4H,1H3
- SMILES: CC1=C(C=CC=C1Cl)F

Properties
Chemical formula	C_{7}H_{6}ClF
Molar mass	144.57 g·mol^{−1}
Boiling point	154–156 °C (309–313 °F)

Hazards
- GHS labelling
Pictograms	(GHS02: Flammable) (GHS07: Exclamation mark)
Signal word	Warning
Hazard statements	H226, H302, H312, H315, H332, H335
Precautionary statements	P210, P233, P240, P241, P242, P243, P261, P264, P270, P271, P280, P302+P352, P303+P361+P353, P304+P340, P305+P351+P338, P321, P330, P362+P364, P370+P378, P403+P233, P403+P235, P405, P501
Flash point	46 °C (115 °F)

Related compounds
Related compounds	2-Chloro-6-fluorobenzaldehyde, toluene
- Except where otherwise noted, data are given for materials in their standard state (at 25 °C [77 °F], 100 kPa). Infobox references

2-Chloro-6-fluorotoluene (CFT) is a halogenated derivative of toluene that is used as an intermediate in numerous organic syntheses.

== Uses ==
CFT is used to prepare 2-chloro-6-fluorobenzaldehyde via oxidation with hydrogen peroxide, which forms an aldehyde group.

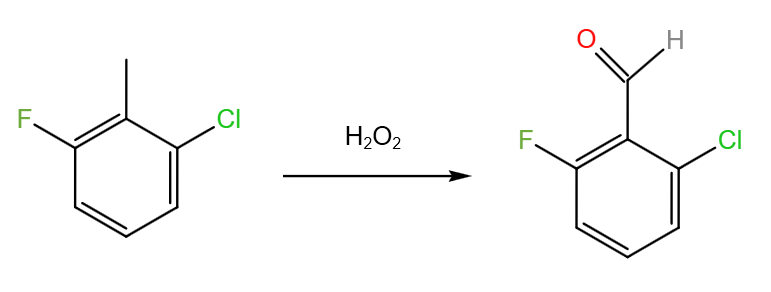

CFT is also used in the preparation of 4-chloro-1H-indazole.
