= BRL-44408 =

Chemical compound (drug)

Clinical data
- ATC code: None

Identifiers
- IUPAC name: 2-[(4,5-Dihydro-1H-imidazol-2-yl)methyl]-2,3-dihydro-1-methyl-1H-isoindole
- CAS Number: 118343-19-4
- PubChem CID: 121850
- IUPHAR/BPS: 525
- ChemSpider: 108707
- UNII: ZET7B198W2
- ChEMBL: ChEMBL216097
- CompTox Dashboard (EPA): DTXSID30922665

Chemical and physical data
- Formula: C_{13}H_{17}N_{3}
- Molar mass: 215.300 g·mol^{−1}
- 3D model (JSmol): Interactive image
- SMILES: N2CCN=C2CN(C1C)Cc3c1cccc3
- InChI: InChI=1S/C13H17N3/c1-10-12-5-3-2-4-11(12)8-16(10)9-13-14-6-7-15-13/h2-5,10H,6-9H2,1H3,(H,14,15); Key:SGOFAUSEYBZKDQ-UHFFFAOYSA-N

BRL-44408 is a drug used in scientific research which acts as a selective antagonist for the α_{2A}-adrenergic receptor. It has been suggested as having potential therapeutic application in the treatment of extrapyramidal side effects produced by some antipsychotic medications.
