= 2C-CN =

Clinical data
- Other names: 25CN; 2,5-Dimethoxy-4-cyanophenethylamine; 4-Cyano-2,5-dimethoxyphenethylamine
- Routes of administration: Oral
- Drug class: Serotonin receptor modulator; Serotonin 5-HT_{2} receptor agonist; Serotonin 5-HT_{2A} receptor agonist; Possible serotonergic psychedelic or hallucinogen
- ATC code: None

Pharmacokinetic data
- Duration of action: Unknown

Identifiers
- IUPAC name: 4-(2-aminoethyl)-2,5-dimethoxybenzonitrile
- CAS Number: 88441-07-0
- PubChem CID: 57474247
- ChemSpider: 28690053
- UNII: 68O9X0114E
- CompTox Dashboard (EPA): DTXSID00726819

Chemical and physical data
- Formula: C_{11}H_{14}N_{2}O_{2}
- Molar mass: 206.245 g·mol^{−1}
- 3D model (JSmol): Interactive image
- SMILES: COC1=CC(=C(C=C1CCN)OC)C#N
- InChI: InChI=1S/C11H14N2O2/c1-14-10-6-9(7-13)11(15-2)5-8(10)3-4-12/h5-6H,3-4,12H2,1-2H3; Key:OGWCKYKYGQORLF-UHFFFAOYSA-N

2C-CN, also known as 4-cyano-2,5-dimethoxyphenethylamine, is a serotonin receptor modulator and possible serotonergic psychedelic of the phenethylamine and 2C families.

== Use and effects ==
2C-CN was previously not known to have been tested in humans and it was unknown whether it produces psychedelic effects. According to Daniel Trachsel however, 2C-CN was inactive at a dose of 10 mg orally, whereas a dose of 22 mg orally possibly produced threshold effects.

== Pharmacology ==
=== Pharmacodynamics ===
2C-CN is a serotonin 5-HT_{2} receptor partial to full agonist, including of the serotonin 5-HT_{2A}, 5-HT_{2B}, and 5-HT_{2C} receptors. Its EC_{50} (E_{max}) values were 78–503 nM (73–91%) at the serotonin 5-HT_{2A} receptor, 650 nM (82%) at the serotonin 5-HT_{2B} receptor, and 140 nM (101%) at the serotonin 5-HT_{2C} receptor. The drug was 10-fold or more less potent as a serotonin 5-HT_{2A} receptor agonist than other notable 2C psychedelics including 2C-B, 2C-D, 2C-T, 2C-P, and 2C-T-7.

== Chemistry ==
=== Synthesis ===
The chemical synthesis of 2C-CN has been described.

=== Derivatives ===
2C-CN is the 2C parent compound of potent serotonin 5-HT_{2A} receptor agonists of the 25-NB family including 25CN-NBOH, 25CN-NBOMe, 25CN-NBF, and 25CN-NBMD, among others. 25CN-NBOH is notable in being one of the most selective serotonin 5-HT_{2A} receptor agonists known. In addition, 25-NB derivatives of 2C-CN are known that act as β-arrestin-biased serotonin 5-HT_{2A} receptor agonists.

== History ==
2C-CN was first described in the scientific literature by 1984. It was briefly mentioned by Alexander Shulgin in his books PiHKAL (Phenethylamines I Have Known and Loved) (1991) and The Shulgin Index, Volume One: Psychedelic Phenethylamines and Related Compounds (2011). Daniel Trachsel described 2C-CN's preliminary properties and effects in humans in 2013. The drug's pharmacology was elucidated in the mid-2020s.

== Society and culture ==
=== Legal status ===
==== Canada ====
2C-CN is a controlled substance in Canada under phenethylamine blanket-ban language.

==== United States ====
2C-CN is not an explicitly controlled substance in the United States. However, it could be considered a controlled substance under the Federal Analogue Act if intended for human consumption.

== See also ==
- 2C (psychedelics)
- DOCN
- 2C-N
- TGF-8027
