= Dizocilpine =

Chemical compound

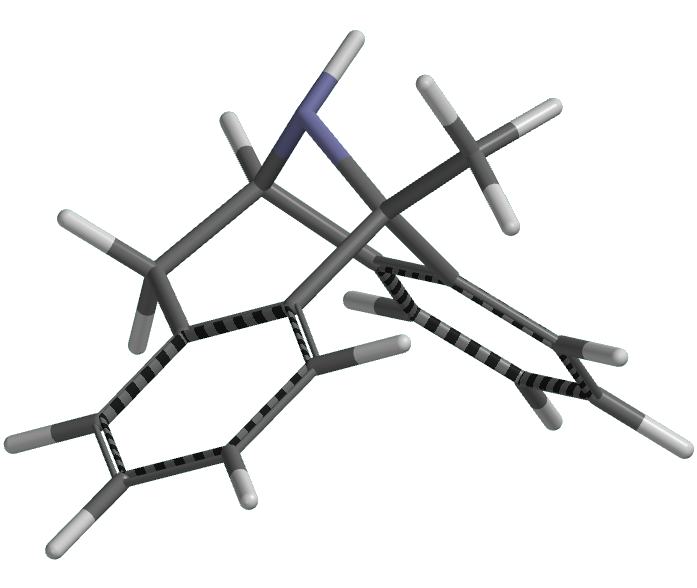

Clinical data
- Routes of administration: By mouth, IM
- ATC code: None

Identifiers
- IUPAC name: (5R,10S)-(+)-5-methyl-10,11-dihydro-5H-dibenzo[a,d]cyclohepten-5,10-imine
- CAS Number: 77086-21-6
- PubChem CID: 180081
- IUPHAR/BPS: 2403
- DrugBank: ?
- ChemSpider: 156718
- UNII: 7PY8KH681I
- ChEBI: CHEBI:34725
- ChEMBL: ChEMBL284237
- CompTox Dashboard (EPA): DTXSID3048447

Chemical and physical data
- Formula: C_{16}H_{15}N
- Molar mass: 221.303 g·mol^{−1}
- 3D model (JSmol): Interactive image
- Melting point: 68.75 °C (155.75 °F)
- SMILES: C[C@]1(C2=C(C[C@H]3N1)C=CC=C2)C4=C3C=CC=C4
- InChI: InChI=1S/C16H15N/c1-16-13-8-4-2-6-11(13)10-15(17-16)12-7-3-5-9-14(12)16/h2-9,15,17H,10H2,1H3/t15-,16+/m1/s1; Key:LBOJYSIDWZQNJS-CVEARBPZSA-N

Dizocilpine (INN), also known as MK-801, is a pore blocker of the NMDA receptor, discovered by a team at Merck in 1982. The drug acts as a potent anticonvulsant and dissociative agent, but is not used clinically due to an adverse safety profile. In laboratory rats, the drug induces Olney's lesions. Dizocilpine is also associated with a number of adverse psychological reactions, including cognitive disruption and psychotic-spectrum reactions. By inhibiting long-term potentiation, dizocilpine impairs learning and memory in rodent and primate models. Due to safety issues, dizocilpine remains a tool in scientific research, rather than a clinical medicine.

Dizocilpine also has activity at nicotinic acetylcholine receptors, as well as serotonin and dopamine transporters.

== Toxicity ==
=== Olney's lesions ===
Dizocilpine, along with various other NMDA antagonists, induce the formation of brain lesions first discovered by John W. Olney in 1989. Dizocilpine leads to the development of neuronal vacuolization in the posterior cingulate/retrosplenial cortex. Other neurons in the area expressed an abnormal amount of heat shock protein as well as increased glucose metabolism in response to NMDA antagonist exposure. Vacuoles began to form within 30 minutes of a subcutaneous dose of dizocilpine 1 mg/kg. Neurons in this area necrotized and were accompanied by a glial response involving astrocytes and microglia.

== Pharmacology ==
=== Pharmacodynamics ===
Dizocilpine binds to the PCP_{1} site at NMDA receptors, physically blocking the pore, preventing an intracellular influx of positively charged ions, such as calcium (Ca^{2+}) and sodium (Na^{+}). Dizocilpine blocks NMDA receptors in a use- and voltage-dependent manner, since the channel must open for the drug to bind inside it.

Dizocilpine has also been found to act as a nicotinic acetylcholine receptor antagonist. It has been shown to bind to and inhibit the serotonin and dopamine transporters as well.

== Recreational use ==
Dizocilpine is rarely used recreationally due to severe risks, unclear dosage information, and lesser recreational benefit compared to other NMDA antagonists. In a study testing self-administration habits of rats with PCP, CPP, and dizocilpine, it was found that the rats showed similar self-administration behavior for all three of the drugs. When a dopamine antagonist was also administered, self administration did not decrease, indicating that dizocilpine has reward potential beyond dopaminergic effects. In another study, dizocilpine administration elicited a strong conditioned place preference in animals, demonstrating a level of reinforcement.

== Research ==
=== An animal model of schizophrenia ===
Dizocilpine has been used to create animal models of schizophrenia due to its ability to induce several positive and negative symptoms, serving as a tool in the evaluation of the glutamatergic hypothesis of the disorder.

The NMDA receptor blockade imposed by dizocilpine accurately models schizophrenia in multiple areas. While low doses were shown to primarily impair cognitive processes such as working memory and long-term potentiation, increased doses led to stereotypy and hyperlocomotion, which correspond to positive symptoms. However, motor and sensorimotor levels influence memory performance, meaning that these additional disruptions may mask or confound certain memory impairments. Subchronic exposure has been shown to mimic psychosis, while chronic administration in laboratory animals resulted in neuropathological changes resembling those in schizophrenia.

Dizocilpine shows selectivity for parvalbumin-positive (PV^{+}) GABAergic interneurons in the prefrontal cortex. Due to downregulation of NMDA receptors on these inhibitory neurons, GABA output is reduced. This leads to paradoxical hyper-excitation of cortical pyramidal neurons, disrupting cognitive processing.

=== Investigational applications ===
The early development of dizocilpine was centered around its potential as a neuroprotective agent that could potentially be used to mitigate excitotoxicity caused by stroke, brain injury, and various neurodegenerative conditions. However, development was dropped as psychotomimetic effects and toxicity such as Olney's lesions became apparent, leaving it as a tool for research into NMDA antagonism and psychosis rather than a clinical drug.

The administration of dizocilpine was shown to protect the hippocampus from ischemia-induced neurodegeneration in the gerbil. During ischemic events, blood and oxygen deprivation causes the brain to release large amounts of excitatory neurotransmitters, leading to excitotoxicity. By blocking NMDA receptors, dizocilpine prevents excessive intracellular calcium influx, preventing excitotoxicity.

== See also ==
- Dextromethorphan (DXM)
- Ibotenic acid
- BQ-869
