= Ervatinine =

Identifiers
CAS Number	99877-65-3
3D model (JSmol)	Interactive image
PubChem CID	163103553
- InChI: InChI=1S/C19H22N2O3/c1-2-19-6-5-14-13(12-4-3-11(22)7-15(12)20-14)8-17(23)21(10-19)9-16-18(19)24-16/h3-4,7,16,18,20,22H,2,5-6,8-10H2,1H3 Key: BONHHVYJMKHBMB-UHFFFAOYSA-N
- SMILES: Oc1ccc2c3CC(=O)N4CC(CCc3[NH]c2c1)(CC)C1OC1C4

Properties
Chemical formula	C_{19}H_{22}N_{2}O_{3}
Molar mass	326.394 g·mol^{−1}
Appearance	Amorphous solid
- Except where otherwise noted, data are given for materials in their standard state (at 25 °C [77 °F], 100 kPa). Infobox references

Ervatinine is an anti-corrosive indole alkaloid from Ervatamia coronaria (syn. Tabernaemontana divaricata).

== See also ==
- Ervaticine
