= Imiloxan =

Chemical compound

Clinical data
- ATC code: none

Identifiers
- IUPAC name: (RS)-2-(2,3-dihydro-1,4-benzodioxin-2-ylmethyl)-1-ethylimidazole
- CAS Number: 81167-16-0
- PubChem CID: 133621
- IUPHAR/BPS: 3470
- ChemSpider: 117866
- UNII: ZJ56PS1DWK
- ChEMBL: ChEMBL578481
- CompTox Dashboard (EPA): DTXSID1045162

Chemical and physical data
- Formula: C_{14}H_{16}N_{2}O_{2}
- Molar mass: 244.294 g·mol^{−1}
- 3D model (JSmol): Interactive image
- SMILES: CCN1C=CN=C1CC2COC3=CC=CC=C3O2
- InChI: InChI=1S/C14H16N2O2/c1-2-16-8-7-15-14(16)9-11-10-17-12-5-3-4-6-13(12)18-11/h3-8,11H,2,9-10H2,1H3; Key:UXABARREKCJULM-UHFFFAOYSA-N

Imiloxan is a drug which is used in scientific research. It acts as a selective antagonist for the α_{2B} adrenergic receptor, and has been useful for distinguishing the actions of the different α_{2} adrenergic subtypes.

== Synthesis ==
Imiloxan Synthesis:

The imidazole portion of imiloxan is prepared by the reaction of an imidate with the diethyl acetal of aminoacetaldehyde. N-Alkylation of the imidazole with ethyl iodide gives imiloxan.
