= Efaroxan =

Chemical compound

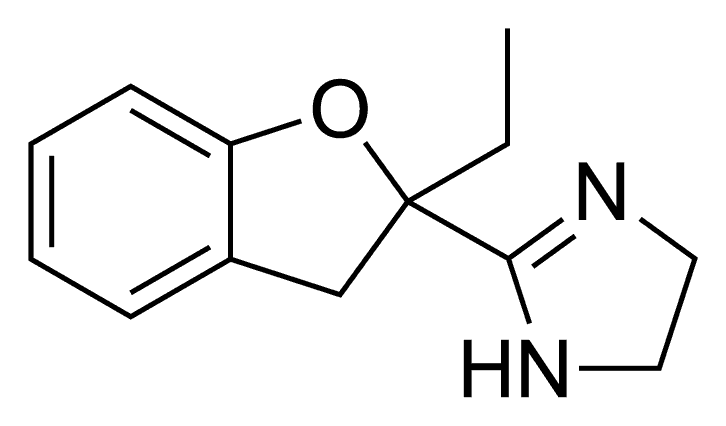

Clinical data
- Routes of administration: Oral
- ATC code: none

Legal status
- Legal status: In general: uncontrolled

Identifiers
- IUPAC name: 2-(2-ethyl-2,3-dihydro-1-benzofuran-2-yl)-4,5-dihydro-1H-imidazole
- CAS Number: 89197-32-0
- PubChem CID: 72016
- ChemSpider: 65015
- UNII: G00490L21H
- ChEMBL: ChEMBL57895
- CompTox Dashboard (EPA): DTXSID8045149

Chemical and physical data
- Formula: C_{13}H_{16}N_{2}O
- Molar mass: 216.284 g·mol^{−1}
- 3D model (JSmol): Interactive image
- SMILES: N\1=C(\NCC/1)C3(Oc2ccccc2C3)CC
- InChI: InChI=1S/C13H16N2O/c1-2-13(12-14-7-8-15-12)9-10-5-3-4-6-11(10)16-13/h3-6H,2,7-9H2,1H3,(H,14,15); Key:RATZLMXRALDSJW-UHFFFAOYSA-N

Efaroxan is an α_{2}-adrenergic receptor antagonist and antagonist of the imidazoline receptor.

== Synthesis ==
Synthesis (Cmp#13): Revised:

The Darzens reaction between 2-fluorobenzaldehyde (1) and ethyl 2-bromobutyrate (2) gives ethyl 2-ethyl-3-(2-fluorophenyl)oxirane-2-carboxylate (3). Catalytic hydrogenation over Pd/C gives ethyl 2-[(2-fluorophenyl)methyl]-2-hydroxybutanoate (4). Saponification of the ester then gives 2-[(2-fluorophenyl)methyl]-2-hydroxybutanoic acid (5). Treatment with 2 molar equivalents of sodium hydride apparently gives 2-ethyl-2,3-dihydrobenzofuran-2-carboxylic acid (6). Treatment of the carboxylic acid with thionyl chloride then gives the acid chloride and subsequent treatment of this with ethylenediamine in the presence of trimethylaluminium completed the synthesis of efaroxan (8).

== See also ==
- Fluparoxan
- Idazoxan
