= BQ-869 =

Clinical data
- Other names: BQ869
- Drug class: NMDA receptor antagonist
- ATC code: None

Chemical and physical data
- Formula: C_{15}H_{11}ClN_{2}
- Molar mass: 254.72 g·mol^{−1}
- 3D model (JSmol): Interactive image
- SMILES: CNC1=CC2=C3C4=C1C=CC=C4NC3=C(Cl)C=C2
- InChI: InChI=1S/C15H11ClN2/c1-17-12-7-8-5-6-10(16)15-13(8)14-9(12)3-2-4-11(14)18-15/h2-7,17-18H,1H3; Key:NFOBXMLDDAQTJH-UHFFFAOYSA-N

BQ-869 is an NMDA receptor antagonist related to dizocilpine (MK-801). It is described as a derivative of dizocilpine and has shown higher potency in comparison. The drug shows neuroprotective effects in rodents, for instance against stroke and cerebral ischemia. It is described as being "extremely potent" and was said to be "the most potent antagonist of NMDA receptors". However, this was not based on standard affinity or functional assays for establishing potency. BQ-869 was described in the scientific literature by Guo Yu and colleagues in Shanghai, China in 2015.

== See also ==
- Dextromethorphan (DXM)
