= PS75 =

Chemical compound

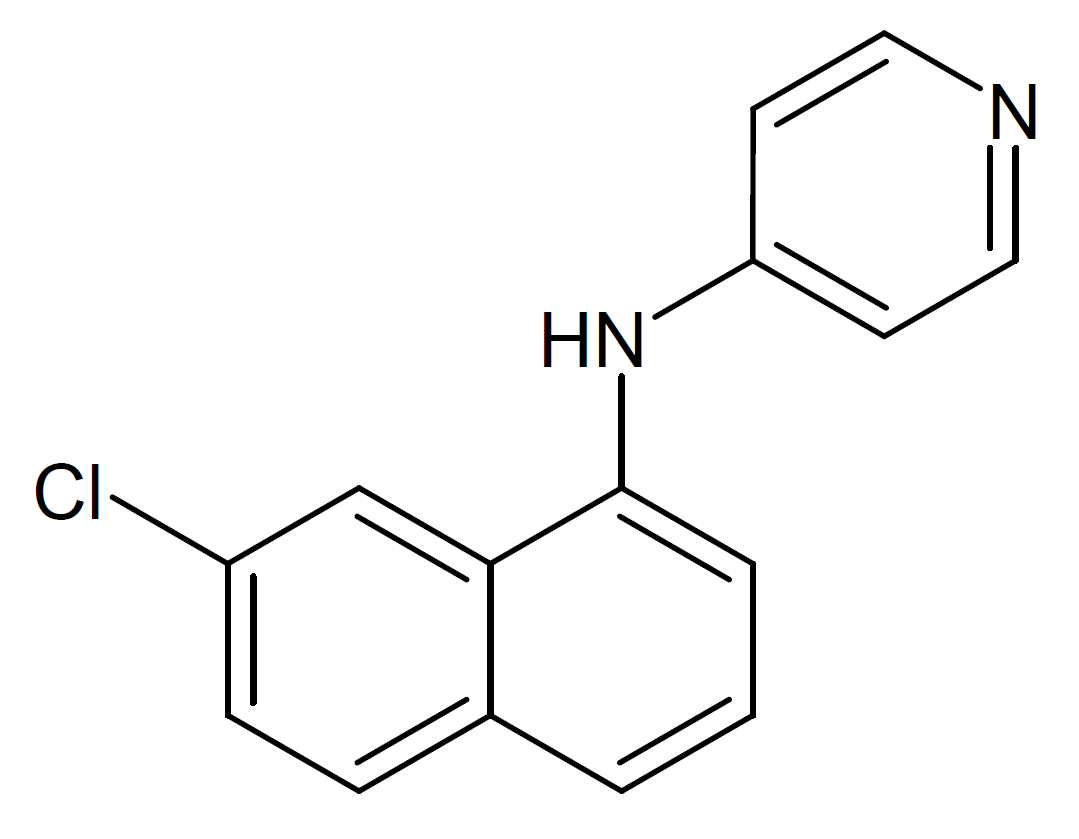

Clinical data
- ATC code: None

Identifiers
- IUPAC name: N-(pyridin-4-yl)-7-chloronaphthalen-1-amine
- CAS Number: 2925328-43-2

Chemical and physical data
- Formula: C_{15}H_{11}ClN_{2}
- Molar mass: 254.72 g·mol^{−1}
- 3D model (JSmol): Interactive image
- SMILES: Clc1cc2c(cccc2cc1)Nc1ccncc1

PS75 is an experimental analgesic drug which acts as a functionally selective alpha-2A (α_{2A}) adrenergic agonist, with a K_{i} of 8.2nM and an EC_{50} of 4.8nM at the α_{2A}-adrenergic receptor. In animal studies it was found to produce analgesia but without the sedation typical of older drugs acting at this target such as dexmedetomidine. While PS75 itself is unlikely to be developed for medical use, the successful separation of analgesia from sedative effects makes it likely that related compounds may be developed as non-sedating, non-opioid analgesic medications.
