= 2-Chlorobenzaldehyde =

Chemical compound

Names
- Preferred IUPAC name 2-Chlorobenzaldehyde
- Other names o-Chlorobenzaldehyde

Identifiers
CAS Number	89-98-5
3D model (JSmol)	Interactive image
ChEMBL	ChEMBL1547989
ChemSpider	21106014
ECHA InfoCard	100.001.779
EC Number	201-956-3
PubChem CID	6996
RTECS number	CU5075000
UNII	QHR24X1LXK
UN number	3265
CompTox Dashboard (EPA)	DTXSID5024764
- InChI: InChI=1S/C7H5ClO/c8-7-4-2-1-3-6(7)5-9/h1-5H Key: FPYUJUBAXZAQNL-UHFFFAOYSA-N
- SMILES: c1ccc(c(c1)C=O)Cl

Properties
Chemical formula	C_{7}H_{5}ClO
Molar mass	140.57 g·mol^{−1}
Appearance	Clear colourless to pale yellow oily liquid
Density	1.25
Melting point	9–12 °C (48–54 °F; 282–285 K)
Boiling point	209–215 °C (408–419 °F; 482–488 K)
Solubility in water	Insoluble
Solubility	Slightly soluble in Acetonitrile, sparingly soluble in DMSO

Hazards
- GHS labelling
Pictograms	(GHS05: Corrosive) (GHS07: Exclamation mark)
Signal word	Danger
Hazard statements	H290, H302, H314, H317
Precautionary statements	P234, P260, P264, P270, P272, P280, P301+P312, P301+P330+P331, P302+P352, P303+P361+P353, P304+P340, P305+P351+P338, P310, P321, P330, P333+P313, P363, P390, P404, P405, P501
Flash point	87 °C (189 °F; 360 K)
Autoignition temperature	385 °C (725 °F; 658 K)
- Except where otherwise noted, data are given for materials in their standard state (at 25 °C [77 °F], 100 kPa). Infobox references

2-Chlorobenzaldehyde (o-chlorobenzaldehyde) is an organic compound with the formula ClC_{6}H_{4}CHO. It is one of three isomeric monochlorinated benzaldehyde. 3-Chlorobenzaldehyde and 4-chlorobenzaldehyde are the other isomers. Whereas benzaldehyde is prone to autoxidation, the 2-chloro derivatives are more air-stable.

== Synthesis and uses ==
It is produced by hydrolysis of 2-chlorobenzal chloride:

ClC_{6}H_{4}CHCl_{2} + H_{2}O → ClC_{6}H_{4}CHO + 2 HCl

2-Chlorobenzaldehyde is used in production of CS gas. It reacts with malononitrile to form CS.

2-Chlorobenzaldehyde is used in the synthesis of: Clopidogrel, Amlodipine, Levamlodipine, Zotepine, Clobenzorex, Tradipitant, Lodaxaprine, Bay-k-9320, SK 609, Sephin 1 & YC 170.
