= Alpha-2B adrenergic receptor =

Protein found in humans

ADRA2B

Identifiers
- Aliases: ADRA2B, ADRA2L1, ADRA2RL1, ADRARL1, ALPHA2BAR, alpha-2BAR, FAME2, adrenoceptor alpha 2B
- External IDs: OMIM: 104260; MGI: 87935; GeneCards: ADRA2B
Available structures
PDB	Ortholog search: PDBe RCSB
PDB	List of PDB id codes 2CVA

Gene location (Human)
Chr.	Chromosome 2 (human)
Band	2q11.2	Start	96,112,876 bp
Band	2q11.2	End	96,116,571 bp

Gene location (Mouse)
Chr.	Chromosome 2 (mouse)
Band	2 F1|2 61.95 cM	Start	127,205,128 bp
Band	2 F1|2 61.95 cM	End	127,209,141 bp
RNA expression pattern
Bgee	Human / Mouse (ortholog); Top expressed in: apex of heart; gastrocnemius muscle; left ventricle; right lobe of liver; spleen; subcutaneous adipose tissue; muscle of thigh; tibial nerve; ascending aorta; gastric mucosa / Top expressed in: right kidney; proximal tubule; human kidney; yolk sac; decidua; embryo; embryo; hepatobiliary system; liver; secondary oocyte; More reference expression data
BioGPS	n/a
Gene ontology
Molecular function	G protein-coupled receptor activity; signal transducer activity; alpha2-adrenergic receptor activity; adrenergic receptor activity; epinephrine binding; protein binding
Cellular component	integral component of membrane; plasma membrane; membrane; integral component of plasma membrane; intracellular anatomical structure; cell surface
Biological process	platelet activation; female pregnancy; G protein-coupled receptor signaling pathway; positive regulation of blood pressure; adrenergic receptor signaling pathway; regulation of vasoconstriction; regulation of vascular associated smooth muscle contraction; positive regulation of uterine smooth muscle contraction; regulation of smooth muscle contraction; signal transduction; activation of protein kinase B activity; negative regulation of epinephrine secretion; cell-cell signaling; adenylate cyclase-activating adrenergic receptor signaling pathway; positive regulation of neuron differentiation; negative regulation of norepinephrine secretion; positive regulation of MAPK cascade; receptor transactivation; adenylate cyclase-modulating G protein-coupled receptor signaling pathway
Sources:Amigo / QuickGO
Orthologs
Databases	NCBI: entry; OMA: entry
Species	Human	Mouse
Entrez	151	11552
Ensembl	ENSG00000274286	ENSMUSG00000058620
UniProt	P18089	P30545
RefSeq (mRNA)	NM_000682	NM_009633
RefSeq (protein)	NP_000673	NP_033763
Location (UCSC)	Chr 2: 96.11 – 96.12 Mb	Chr 2: 127.21 – 127.21 Mb
PubMed search
- Wikidata
View/Edit Human	View/Edit Mouse

The alpha-2B adrenergic receptor (α_{2B} adrenoceptor) is a G-protein coupled receptor. It is a subtype of the adrenergic receptor family. The human gene encoding this receptor has the symbol ADRA2B. ADRA2B orthologs have been identified in several mammals.

== Receptor ==
α_{2}-adrenergic receptors include 3 highly homologous subtypes: α_{2A}, α_{2B}, and α_{2C}. These receptors have a critical role in regulating neurotransmitter release from sympathetic nerves and from adrenergic neurons in the central nervous system.

== Clinical significance ==
This gene encodes the α_{2B} subtype, which was observed to associate with eIF-2B, a guanine nucleotide exchange protein that functions in regulation of translation. A polymorphic variant of the α_{2B} subtype, which lacks 3 glutamic acids from a glutamic acid repeat element, was identified to have decreased G protein-coupled receptor kinase-mediated phosphorylation and desensitization; this polymorphic form is also associated with reduced basal metabolic rate in obese subjects and may therefore contribute to the pathogenesis of obesity. This gene contains no introns in either its coding or untranslated sequences.

A deletion variant of the α_{2B} adrenergic receptor has been shown to be related to emotional memory in Europeans and Africans. This variant also predisposed people who had it to focus more on negative aspects of a situation. This predisposition remained present in people with the variant gene who took a single dose of the noradrenergic antidepressant reboxetine, but was weakened in people without the variant.

== Evolution ==
The ADRA2B gene (sometimes referenced as A2AB) is used in animals as a nuclear DNA phylogenetic marker. This intronless gene has first been used to explore the phylogeny of the major groups of mammals, and contributed to reveal that placental orders are distributed into four major clades: Xenarthra, Afrotheria, Laurasiatheria, and Euarchontoglires. Comparative analysis of the primary protein sequence of ADRA2B across placentals also showed the high conservation of residues thought to be involved in agonist binding and in G protein–coupling. However, great variations are observed in the very long, third intracellular loop, with a polyglutamyl domain displaying pervasive length differences.

== Ligands ==
=== Agonists ===
- (−)-Dibromophakellin
- Clonidine

=== Antagonists ===
- ADRIANA – highly selective
- Imiloxan
- Yohimbine

== See also ==
- Adrenergic receptor
