= 4-Chlorobenzaldehyde =

Names
- Preferred IUPAC name 4-Chlorobenzaldehyde

Identifiers
CAS Number	104-88-1
3D model (JSmol)	Interactive image
Beilstein Reference	385858
ChEMBL	ChEMBL1474
ChemSpider	21106019
ECHA InfoCard	100.002.953
EC Number	203-247-4
KEGG	C06648
PubChem CID	7726
UNII	E67727UP9Z
UN number	2811
CompTox Dashboard (EPA)	DTXSID2021860
- InChI: InChI=1S/C7H5ClO/c8-7-3-1-6(5-9)2-4-7/h1-5H Key: AVPYQKSLYISFPO-UHFFFAOYSA-N
- SMILES: C1=CC(=CC=C1C=O)Cl

Properties
Chemical formula	C_{7}H_{5}ClO
Molar mass	140.57 g·mol^{−1}
Melting point	47.5 °C (117.5 °F; 320.6 K)
Boiling point	213.5 °C (416.3 °F; 486.6 K)

Hazards
- GHS labelling
Pictograms	(GHS07: Exclamation mark) (GHS09: Environmental hazard)
Signal word	Warning
Hazard statements	H302, H315, H317, H319, H411
Precautionary statements	P261, P264, P264+P265, P270, P271, P272, P273, P280, P301+P317, P302+P352, P304+P340, P305+P351+P338, P319, P321, P330, P332+P317, P333+P313, P337+P317, P362+P364, P391, P403+P233, P405, P501
- Except where otherwise noted, data are given for materials in their standard state (at 25 °C [77 °F], 100 kPa). Infobox references

4-Chlorobenzaldehyde (p-Chlorobenzaldehyde) is an organic compound with the formula ClC_{6}H_{4}CHO. It is one of three isomeric monochlorinated benzaldehydes.

== Preparation ==
It can be produced by hydrolysis of 4-chlorobenzal chloride:

ClC_{6}H_{4}CHCl_{2} + H_{2}O → ClC_{6}H_{4}CHO + 2 HCl

It can also be produced by the oxidation of 4-chlorobenzyl alcohol. It can be further oxidized to 4-chlorobenzoic acid. It will react with malononitrile to form 4-chlorobenzylidenylmalononitrile. 4-Chlorobenzaldehyde reacts with benzylamine to produce N-(4-chlorobenzylidenyl)benzylamine.

== Applications ==
- AW-15'1129
