= Alpha-2A adrenergic receptor =

Protein-coding gene in the species Homo sapiens

ADRA2A
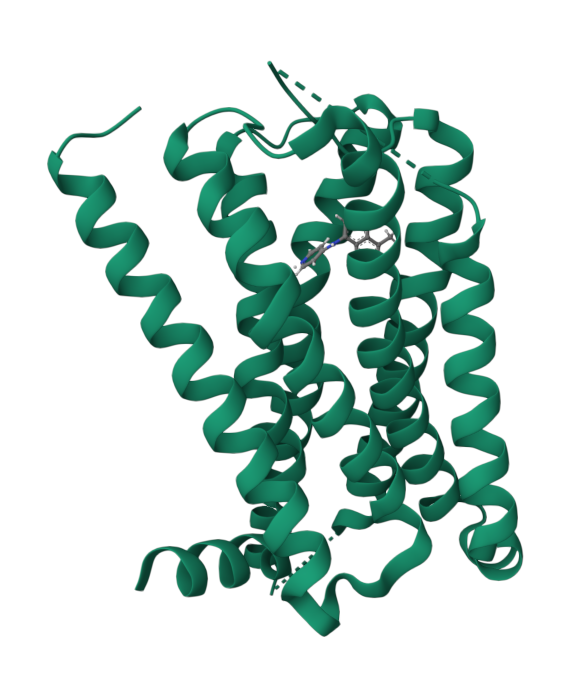

Identifiers
- Aliases: ADRA2A, ADRA2, ADRA2R, ADRAR, ALPHA2AAR, ZNF32, adrenoceptor alpha 2A
- External IDs: OMIM: 104210; MGI: 87934; GeneCards: ADRA2A
Available structures
PDB	Ortholog search: PDBe RCSB
PDB	List of PDB id codes 1HLL, 1HO9, 1HOD, 1HOF

Gene location (Human)
Chr.	Chromosome 10 (human)
Band	10q25.2	Start	111,077,029 bp
Band	10q25.2	End	111,080,907 bp

Gene location (Mouse)
Chr.	Chromosome 19 (mouse)
Band	19 D2|19 49.04 cM	Start	54,032,582 bp
Band	19 D2|19 49.04 cM	End	54,037,413 bp
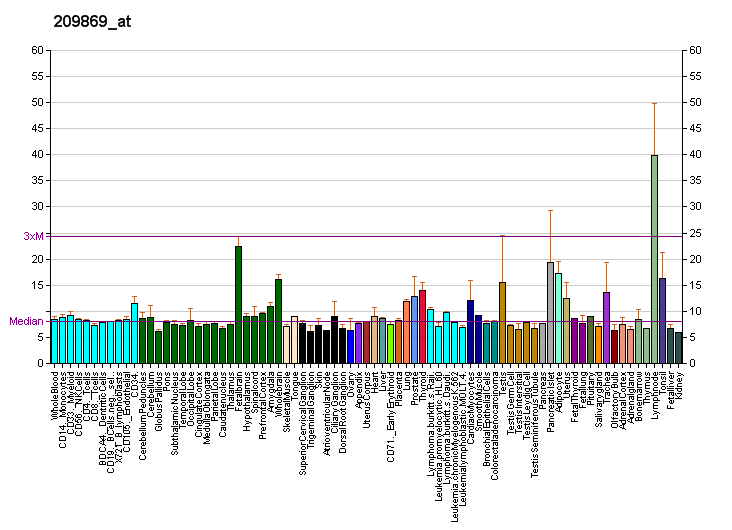
RNA expression pattern
Bgee	Human / Mouse (ortholog); Top expressed in: subcutaneous adipose tissue; canal of the cervix; ectocervix; mucosa of transverse colon; pericardium; gallbladder; ganglionic eminence; body of pancreas; abdominal fat; lactiferous gland / Top expressed in: pontine nuclei; lateral septal nucleus; islet of Langerhans; stroma of bone marrow; dorsomedial hypothalamic nucleus; lumbar subsegment of spinal cord; subiculum; gastrula; mammillary body; medullary collecting duct; More reference expression data
BioGPS	More reference expression data
Gene ontology
Molecular function	alpha-2C adrenergic receptor binding; G protein-coupled receptor activity; protein homodimerization activity; epinephrine binding; norepinephrine binding; alpha-1B adrenergic receptor binding; signal transducer activity; adrenergic receptor activity; protein binding; alpha2-adrenergic receptor activity; protein heterodimerization activity; thioesterase binding; heterotrimeric G-protein binding; protein kinase binding
Cellular component	integral component of membrane; membrane; receptor complex; plasma membrane; integral component of plasma membrane; basolateral plasma membrane; cytoplasm
Biological process	G protein-coupled receptor signaling pathway; positive regulation of epidermal growth factor-activated receptor activity; activation of protein kinase B activity; negative regulation of insulin secretion; positive regulation of MAP kinase activity; negative regulation of epinephrine secretion; glucose homeostasis; regulation of smooth muscle contraction; positive regulation of cytokine production; regulation of insulin secretion; positive regulation of cell migration; positive regulation of potassium ion transport; phospholipase C-activating adrenergic receptor signaling pathway; positive regulation of wound healing; negative regulation of norepinephrine secretion; positive regulation of membrane protein ectodomain proteolysis; negative regulation of insulin secretion involved in cellular response to glucose stimulus; adenylate cyclase-inhibiting adrenergic receptor signaling pathway; negative regulation of calcium ion transmembrane transporter activity; cellular response to hormone stimulus; regulation of vasoconstriction; negative regulation of calcium ion-dependent exocytosis; Rho protein signal transduction; positive regulation of cell population proliferation; negative regulation of calcium ion transport; intestinal absorption; Ras protein signal transduction; negative regulation of lipid catabolic process; activation of protein kinase activity; actin cytoskeleton organization; signal transduction; platelet activation; positive regulation of MAPK cascade; adrenergic receptor signaling pathway; adenylate cyclase-inhibiting G protein-coupled receptor signaling pathway; adenylate cyclase-activating G protein-coupled receptor signaling pathway; adenylate cyclase-activating adrenergic receptor signaling pathway; receptor transactivation; adenylate cyclase-modulating G protein-coupled receptor signaling pathway
Sources:Amigo / QuickGO
Orthologs
Databases	NCBI: entry; OMA: entry
Species	Human	Mouse
Entrez	150	11551
Ensembl	ENSG00000150594	ENSMUSG00000033717
UniProt	P08913	Q01338
RefSeq (mRNA)	NM_000681	NM_007417
RefSeq (protein)	NP_000672	NP_031443
Location (UCSC)	Chr 10: 111.08 – 111.08 Mb	Chr 19: 54.03 – 54.04 Mb
PubMed search
- Wikidata
View/Edit Human	View/Edit Mouse

The alpha-2A adrenergic receptor (α_{2A} adrenoceptor), also known as ADRA2A, is an α_{2}-adrenergic receptor, and also denotes the human gene encoding it.

== Receptor ==
α_{2}-adrenergic receptors include 3 highly homologous subtypes: α_{2A}, α_{2B}, and α_{2C}. These receptors have a critical role in regulating neurotransmitter release from sympathetic nerves and from adrenergic neurons in the central nervous system. Studies in mice revealed that both the α_{2A} and α_{2C} subtypes were required for normal presynaptic control of transmitter release from sympathetic nerves in the heart and from central noradrenergic neurons; the α_{2A} subtype inhibited transmitter release at high stimulation frequencies, whereas the α_{2C} subtype modulated neurotransmission at lower levels of nerve activity.

== Gene ==
This gene encodes α_{2A} subtype and it contains no introns in either its coding or untranslated sequences.

== Ligands ==
=== Agonists ===
- 4-NEMD
- Brimonidine
- Clonidine
- Detomidine
- Dexmedetomidine
- Guanfacine
- Lofexidine
- Myrcene
- Medetomidine
- PS75
- Tasipimidine
- Tizanidine
- Xylazine

=== Antagonists ===
- Atipamezole
- Idazoxan
- 1-PP (active metabolite of buspirone and gepirone)
- Asenapine
- BRL-44408
- Clozapine
- Lurasidone
- Mianserin
- Mirtazapine
- Paliperidone
- Risperidone
- Yohimbine
- Trazodone

== See also ==
- Adrenergic receptor
