= List of adrenergic drugs =

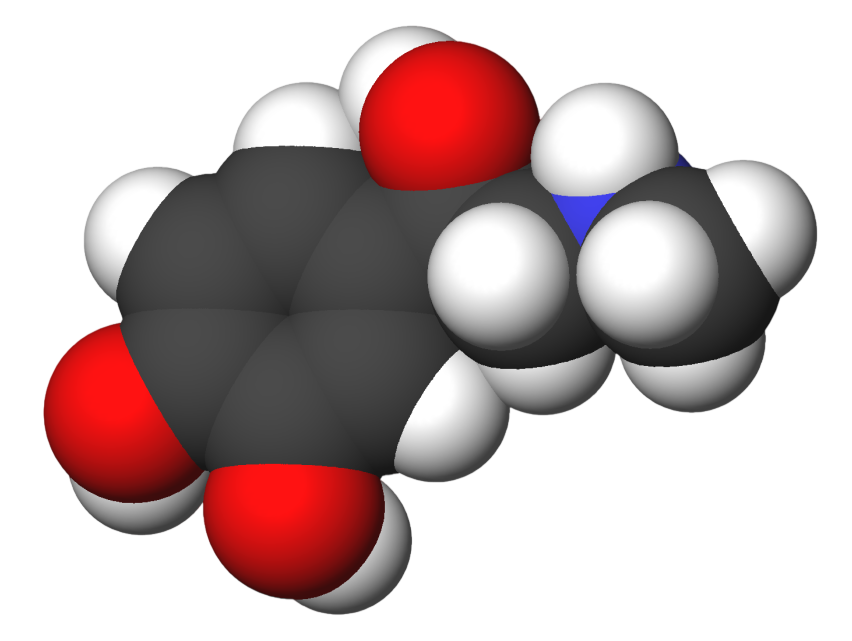
Epinephrine

This is a list of adrenergic drugs. These are pharmaceutical drugs, naturally occurring compounds and other chemicals that influence the function of the neurotransmitter epinephrine (adrenaline).

== Receptor ligands ==
=== α_{1}-adrenergic receptor ligands ===
==== Agonists ====
Etilefrine

- Amidephrine
- Anisodamine
- Anisodine
- Cirazoline
- Dipivefrine
- Dopamine
- Ephedrine
- Epinephrine (adrenaline)
- Etilefrine
- Ethylnorepinephrine
- 5-Fluoronorepinephrine
- 6-Fluoronorepinephrine
- Indanidine
- Levonordefrin
- Metaraminol
- Methoxamine
- Methyldopa
- Midodrine
- Naphazoline
- Norepinephrine (noradrenaline)
- Octopamine
- Oxymetazoline
- Phenylephrine
- Phenylpropanolamine
- Pseudoephedrine
- Synephrine
- Tetrahydrozoline

==== Antagonists ====
- Abanoquil
- Adimolol
- Ajmalicine
- Alfuzosin
- Amosulalol
- Arotinolol
- Atiprosin
- Benoxathian
- Buflomedil
- Bunazosin
- Carvedilol
- CI-926
- Corynanthine
- Dapiprazole
- DL-017
- Domesticine
- Doxazosin
- Eugenodilol
- Fenspiride
- GYKI-12,743
- GYKI-16,084
- Indoramin
- Ketanserin
- L-765,314
- Labetalol
- Mephendioxan
- Metazosin
- Monatepil
- Moxisylyte (thymoxamine)
- Naftopidil
- Nantenine
- Neldazosin
- Nicergoline
- Niguldipine
- Pelanserin
- Phendioxan
- Phenoxybenzamine
- Phentolamine
- Piperoxan
- Prazosin
- Quinazosin
- Ritanserin
- RS-97,078
- SGB-1,534
- Silodosin
- SL-89.0591
- Spiperone
- Talipexole
- Tamsulosin
- Terazosin
- Tibalosin
- Tiodazosin
- Tipentosin
- Tolazoline
- Trimazosin
- Upidosin
- Urapidil
- Zolertine

Many tricyclic antidepressants, tetracyclic antidepressants, antipsychotics, ergolines, and some piperazines like buspirone, trazodone, nefazodone, etoperidone, and mepiprazole antagonize α_{1}-adrenergic receptors as well, which contributes to their side effects such as orthostatic hypotension.

=== α_{2}-adrenergic receptor ligands ===
==== Agonists ====
- Adrenoswitches (photoswitchable agonists)
- Amitraz
- Apraclonidine
- Brimonidine
- Cannabivarin
- Clonidine
- Detomidine
- Dexmedetomidine
- Dihydroergotamine
- Dipivefrine
- Dopamine
- Ephedrine
- Ergotamine
- Epinephrine (adrenaline)
- Esproquin
- Etilefrine
- Ethylnorepinephrine
- 6-Fluoronorepinephrine
- Guanabenz
- Guanfacine
- Guanoxabenz
- Levonordefrin
- Lofexidine
- Medetomidine
- Methyldopa
- Mivazerol
- Naphazoline
- 4-NEMD
- (R)-3-Nitrobiphenyline
- Norepinephrine (noradrenaline)
- Phenylpropanolamine
- Piperoxan
- Pseudoephedrine
- Rilmenidine
- Romifidine
- Talipexole
- Tetrahydrozoline
- Tizanidine
- Tolonidine
- Urapidil
- Xylazine
- Xylometazoline

==== Antagonists ====
- Adimolol
- Aptazapine
- Atipamezole
- BRL-44408
- Buflomedil
- Cirazoline
- Efaroxan
- Esmirtazapine
- Fenmetozole
- Fluparoxan
- GYKI-12,743
- GYKI-16,084
- Idazoxan
- Mianserin
- Mirtazapine
- MK-912
- NAN-190
- Olanzapine
- Phentolamine
- Phenoxybenzamine
- Piperoxan
- Piribedil
- Pyrimidinylpiperazine
- Rauwolscine
- Rotigotine
- SB-269,970
- Setiptiline
- Spiroxatrine
- Sunepitron
- Tolazoline
- Yohimbine

Many atypical antipsychotics and azapirones like buspirone and gepirone (via metabolite pyrimidinylpiperazine) antagonize α_{2}-adrenergic receptors as well.

=== β-adrenergic receptor ligands ===
==== Agonists ====
Salbutamol

- Abediterol
- Amibegron
- Arbutamine
- Arformoterol
- Arotinolol
- Bambuterol
- Befunolol
- Bitolterol
- Bromoacetylalprenololmenthane (BAAM)
- Broxaterol
- Buphenine
- Carbuterol
- Cimaterol
- Clenbuterol
- Denopamine
- Deterenol
- Dipivefrine
- Dobutamine
- Dopamine
- Dopexamine
- Ephedrine
- Epinephrine (adrenaline)
- Etafedrine
- Etilefrine
- Ethylnorepinephrine
- Fenoterol
- 2-Fluoronorepinephrine
- 5-Fluoronorepinephrine
- Formoterol
- Hexoprenaline
- Higenamine
- Indacaterol
- Isoetarine
- Isoprenaline (isoproterenol)
- N-Isopropyloctopamine
- Isoxsuprine
- Labetalol
- Levonordefrin
- Levosalbutamol
- Mabuterol
- Methoxyphenamine
- Methyldopa
- Norepinephrine (noradrenaline)
- Orciprenaline
- Oxyfedrine
- Phenylpropanolamine
- Pirbuterol
- Prenalterol
- Ractopamine
- Procaterol
- Pseudoephedrine
- Quinterenol
- Reproterol
- Rimiterol
- Ritodrine
- Salbutamol (albuterol)
- Salmeterol
- Solabegron
- Terbutaline
- Tretoquinol
- Tulobuterol
- Xamoterol
- Zilpaterol
- Zinterol

==== Antagonists ====
- Acebutolol
- Adaprolol
- Adimolol
- Afurolol
- Alprenolol
- Alprenoxime
- Amosulalol
- Ancarolol
- Arnolol
- Arotinolol
- Atenolol
- Befunolol
- Betaxolol
- Bevantolol
- Bisoprolol
- Bopindolol
- Bornaprolol
- Brefonalol
- Bucindolol
- Bucumolol
- Bufetolol
- Bufuralol
- Bunitrolol
- Bunolol
- Bupranolol
- Butaxamine
- Butidrine
- Butofilolol
- Capsinolol
- Carazolol
- Carpindolol
- Carteolol
- Carvedilol
- Celiprolol
- Cetamolol
- Cicloprolol
- Cinamolol
- Cloranolol
- Cyanopindolol
- Dalbraminol
- Dexpropranolol
- Diacetolol
- Dichloroisoprenaline
- Dihydroalprenolol
- Dilevalol
- Diprafenone
- Draquinolol
- Ecastolol
- Epanolol
- Ericolol
- Ersentilide
- Esatenolol
- Esmolol
- Eugenodilol
- Exaprolol
- Falintolol
- Flestolol
- Flusoxolol
- Hydroxycarteolol
- Hydroxytertatolol
- ICI-118,551
- Idropranolol
- Indenolol
- Indopanolol
- Iodocyanopindolol
- Iprocrolol
- Isoxaprolol
- Isamoltane
- Labetalol
- Landiolol
- Levobetaxolol
- Levobunolol
- Levocicloprolol
- Levomoprolol
- Medroxalol
- Mepindolol
- Metalol
- Metipranolol
- Metoprolol
- Moprolol
- Nadolol
- Nadoxolol
- Nafetolol
- Nebivolol
- Neraminol
- Nifenalol
- Nipradilol
- Oberadilol
- Oxprenolol
- Pacrinolol
- Pafenolol
- Pamatolol
- Pargolol
- Parodilol
- Penbutolol
- Penirolol
- PhQA-33
- Pindolol
- Pirepolol
- Practolol
- Primidolol
- Procinolol
- Pronethalol
- Propafenone
- Propranolol
- Ridazolol
- Ronactolol
- Soquinolol
- Sotalol
- Spirendolol
- SR 59230A
- Sulfinalol
- TA-2005
- Talinolol
- Tazolol
- Teoprolol
- Tertatolol
- Tienoxolol
- Tilisolol
- Timolol
- Tiprenolol
- Tolamolol
- Toliprolol
- Tribendilol
- Trigevolol
- Xibenolol
- Xipranolol

== Reuptake inhibitors ==
=== Norepinephrine transporter (NET) inhibitors ===
Reboxetine

Selective norepinephrine reuptake inhibitors
Amedalin
Atomoxetine (tomoxetine)
Ciclazindol
Daledalin
Esreboxetine
Lortalamine
Mazindol
Nisoxetine
Reboxetine
Talopram
Talsupram
Tandamine
Viloxazine

Norepinephrine-dopamine reuptake inhibitors
Amineptine
Bupropion (amfebutamone)
Fencamine
Fencamfamine
Lefetamine
Levophacetoperane
LR-5182
Manifaxine
Methylphenidate
Nomifensine
O-2172
Radafaxine

Serotonin-norepinephrine reuptake inhibitors
Bicifadine
Desvenlafaxine
Duloxetine
Eclanamine
Levomilnacipran
Milnacipran
Sibutramine
Venlafaxine

Serotonin-norepinephrine-dopamine reuptake inhibitors
Brasofensine
Diclofensine
DOV-102,677
DOV-21,947
DOV-216,303
JNJ-7925476
JZ-IV-10
Methylnaphthidate
Naphyrone
NS-2359
PRC200-SS
SEP-225,289
SEP-227,162
Tesofensine

Tricyclic antidepressants
Amitriptyline
Butriptyline
Cianopramine
Clomipramine
Desipramine
Dosulepin
Doxepin
Imipramine
Lofepramine
melitracen
Nortriptyline
Protriptyline
Trimipramine

Tetracyclic antidepressants
Amoxapine
Maprotiline
Mianserin
Oxaprotiline
Setiptiline

Others
Cocaine
CP-39,332
EXP-561
Fezolamine
Ginkgo biloba
Indeloxazine
Nefazodone
Nefopam
Pridefrine
Tapentadol
Teniloxazine
Tramadol
Ziprasidone

=== Vesicular monoamine transporter (VMAT) inhibitors ===
- Ibogaine
- Reserpine
- Tetrabenazine
- Bietaserpine

== Releasing agents ==
Aminorex

Morpholines
Fenbutrazate
Morazone
Phendimetrazine
Phenmetrazine

Oxazolines
Aminorex
Clominorex
Cyclazodone
Fenozolone
Fluminorex
4-Methylaminorex
Pemoline
Thozalinone

Phenethylamines (also amphetamines, cathinones, phentermines, etc.)
2-OH-PEA
4-CAB
4-FA
4-FMA
4-MA
4-MMA
Alfetamine
Amfecloral
Amfepentorex
Amfepramone
Amphetamine
- dextroamphetamine
- levoamphetamine
Amphetaminil
β-Me-PEA
BDB
Benzphetamine
BOH
Buphedrone
Butylone
Cathine
Cathinone
Clobenzorex
Clortermine
D-Deprenyl
Dimethylamphetamine
Dimethylcathinone (dimethylpropion, metamfepramone)
DMA
DMMA
EBDB
Ephedrine
Ethcathinone
Ethylamphetamine
Ethylone
Famprofazone
Fenethylline
Fenproporex
Flephedrone
Fludorex
Furfenorex
Hordenine
IAP
IMP
Lisdexamfetamine
Lophophine
MBDB
MDA (tenamfetamine)
MDEA
MDMA
MDMPEA
MDOH
MDPEA
Mefenorex
Mephedrone
Mephentermine
Methamphetamine
- dextromethamphetamine
- levomethamphetamine
Methcathinone
Methedrone
Methylone
NAP
Ortetamine
Paredrine
pBA
pCA
Pentorex (phenpentermine)
Phenethylamine
Pholedrine
Phenpromethamine
Phentermine
Phenylpropanolamine
pIA
Prenylamine
Propylamphetamine
Pseudoephedrine
Selegiline (L-deprenyl)
Tiflorex
Tyramine
Xylopropamine
Zylofuramine

Piperazines
Benzylpiperazine (BZP)
2,5-Dimethoxy-4-bromobenzylpiperazine (2C-B-BZP)
Methylbenzylpiperazine (MBZP)
Metachlorophenylpiperazine (mCPP)
Methylenedioxybenzylpiperazine (MDBZP)
Methoxyphenylpiperazine (MeOPP)
Parafluorophenylpiperazine (pFPP)

Others
2-Amino-1,2-dihydronaphthalene
2-Aminoindane
2-Aminotetralin
2-Benzylpiperidine
4-Benzylpiperidine
Clofenciclan
Cyclopentamine
Cypenamine
Cyprodenate
Feprosidnine
Gilutensin
Heptaminol
Hexacyclonate
Indanorex
5-Iodo-2-aminoindane (5-IAI)
Isometheptene
Methylhexanamine
Octodrine
Phthalimidopropiophenone
Propylhexedrine
- levopropylhexedrine
Tuaminoheptane

== Enzyme inhibitors ==
=== Anabolism ===
==== Phenylalanine hydroxylase (PAH) inhibitors ====
- 3,4-Dihydroxystyrene

==== Tyrosine hydroxylase inhibitors ====
- 3-Iodotyrosine
- Aquayamycin
- Bulbocapnine
- Metirosine
- Oudenone

==== Aromatic L-amino acid decarboxylase (AAAD) inhibitors ====
- Benserazide
- Carbidopa
- Genistein
- Methyldopa

==== Dopamine-beta-hydroxylase (DBH) inhibitors ====
- Bupicomide
- Disulfiram
- Dopastin
- Fusaric acid
- Nepicastat
- Phenopicolinic acid
- Tropolone

==== Phenylethanolamine N-methyltransferase (PNMT) inhibitors ====
- CGS-19281A
- SKF-64139
- SKF-7698

=== Catabolism ===
==== Monoamine oxidase (MAO) inhibitors ====
Selegiline

Nonselective
Benmoxin
Caroxazone
Echinopsidine
Furazolidone
Hydralazine
Indantadol
Iproclozide
Iproniazid
Isocarboxazid
Isoniazid
Linezolid
Mebanazine
Metfendrazine
Nialamide
Octamoxin
Paraxazone
Phenelzine
Pheniprazine
Phenoxypropazine
Pivalylbenzhydrazine
Procarbazine
Safrazine
Tranylcypromine

MAO-A selective
Amiflamine
Bazinaprine
Befloxatone
Befol
Brofaromine
Cimoxatone
Clorgiline
Esuprone
Harmala alkaloids
- harmine
- harmaline
- tetrahydroharmine
- harman
- norharman
- etc.
Methylene Blue
Metralindole
Minaprine
Moclobemide
Pirlindole
Sercloremine
Tetrindole
Toloxatone
Tyrima

MAO-B selective
D-Deprenyl
Selegiline (L-deprenyl)
Ladostigil
Lazabemide
Milacemide
Mofegiline
Pargyline
Rasagiline
Safinamide

MAO-B inhibitors also influence norepinephrine/epinephrine levels since they inhibit the breakdown of their precursor dopamine.

==== Catechol-O-methyl transferase (COMT) inhibitors ====
- Entacapone
- Tolcapone

== Others ==
=== Precursors ===
L-Phenylalanine

- L-Phenylalanine → L-tyrosine → L-DOPA (levodopa) → dopamine
- L-DOPS (droxidopa)

=== Cofactors ===
- Ferrous iron (Fe^{2+})
- S-Adenosyl-L-methionine
- Vitamin B_{3}
  - niacin
  - nicotinamide → NADPH
- Vitamin B_{6} (pyridoxine, pyridoxamine, pyridoxal → Pyridoxal phosphate)
- Vitamin B_{9} (folic acid → tetrahydrofolic acid)
- Vitamin C
  - ascorbic acid
- Zinc (Zn^{2+})

=== Activity enhancers ===
- Benzofuranylpropylaminopentane (BPAP)
- Phenylpropylaminopentane (PPAP)

=== Release blockers ===
- Bethanidine
- Bretylium
- Guanadrel
- Guanazodine
- Guanclofine
- Guanethidine
- Guanoxan

=== Toxins ===
- Oxidopamine (6-hydroxydopamine)
