= List of dopaminergic drugs =

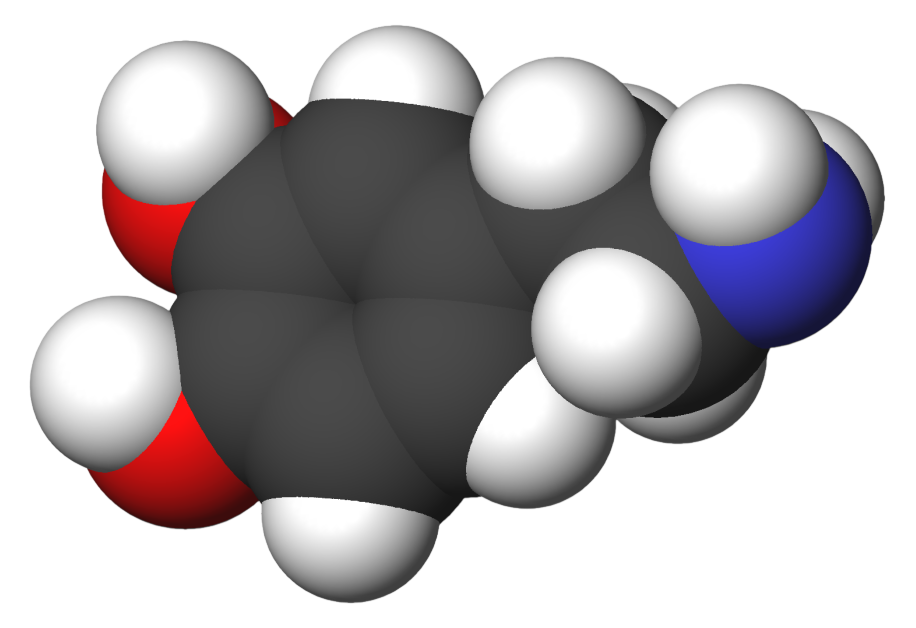
Dopamine

This is a list of dopaminergic drugs. These are pharmaceutical drugs, naturally occurring compounds and other chemicals that influence the function of the neurotransmitter dopamine.

== Dopamine receptor ligands ==
Dopamine receptors are a class of G protein-coupled receptors that are prominent in the vertebrate central nervous system (CNS) and are implicated in many neurological processes, including motivational and incentive salience, cognition, memory, learning, and fine motor control, as well as modulation of neuroendocrine signaling. Abnormal dopamine receptor signaling and dopaminergic nerve function is implicated in several neuropsychiatric disorders. Dopamine receptors are therefore common drug targets.

Dopamine receptors activate different effectors through not only G-protein coupling, but also signaling through different protein (dopamine receptor-interacting proteins) interactions.

=== Agonists ===
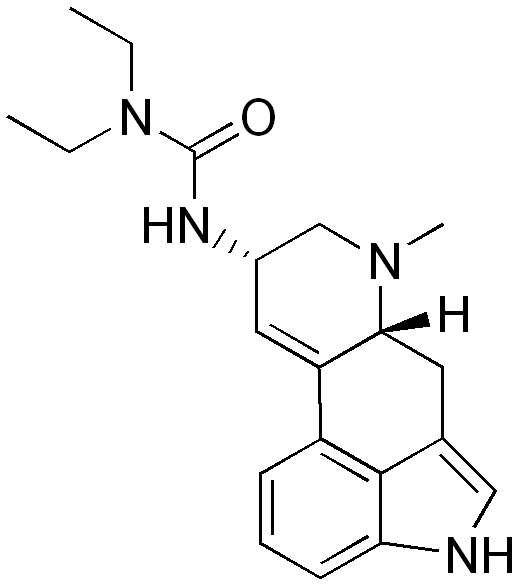
Lisuride

Adamantanes: Amantadine • Memantine • Rimantadine

Aminotetralins: 7-OH-DPAT • 8-OH-PBZI • Rotigotine • UH-232

Benzazepines: 6-Br-APB • Fenoldopam • SKF-38,393 • SKF-77,434 • SKF-81,297 • SKF-82,958 • SKF-83,959

Ergolines: Bromocriptine • Cabergoline • Dihydroergocryptine • Lisuride • Lysergic acid diethylamide (LSD) • Pergolide

Dihydrexidine derivatives: 2-OH-NPA • A-86,929 • Ciladopa • Dihydrexidine • Dinapsoline • Dinoxyline • Doxanthrine

Others: A-68,930 • A-77,636 • A-412,997 • ABT-670 • ABT-724 • Aplindore • Apomorphine • Aripiprazole • Azodopa • Bifeprunox • BP-897 • CY-208,243 • Dizocilpine • Etilevodopa • Flibanserin • Ketamine • Melevodopa • Modafinil • Pardoprunox • Phencyclidine • PD-128,907 • PD-168,077 • PF-219,061 • Piribedil • Pramipexole • Propylnorapomorphine • Pukateine • Quinagolide • Quinelorane • Quinpirole • RDS-127 • Ro10-5824 • Ropinirole • Rotigotine • Roxindole • Salvinorin A • SKF-89,145 • Sumanirole • Terguride • Umespirone • WAY-100,635

=== Antagonists ===
Typical antipsychotics: Acepromazine • Azaperone • Benperidol • Bromperidol • Clopenthixol • Chlorpromazine • Chlorprothixene • Droperidol • Flupentixol • Fluphenazine • Fluspirilene • Haloperidol • Loxapine • Mesoridazine • Methotrimeprazine • Nemonapride • Penfluridol • Perazine • Periciazine • Perphenazine • Pimozide • Prochlorperazine • Promazine • Sulforidazine • Sulpiride • Sultopride • Thioridazine • Thiothixene • Trifluoperazine • Triflupromazine • Trifluperidol • Zuclopenthixol

Atypical antipsychotics: Amisulpride • Asenapine • Blonanserin • Cariprazine • Carpipramine • Clocapramine • Clozapine • Gevotroline • Iloperidone • Lurasidone • Melperone • Molindone • Mosapramine • Ocaperidone • Olanzapine • Paliperidone • Perospirone • Piquindone • Quetiapine • Remoxipride • Risperidone • Sertindole • Tiospirone • Ziprasidone • Zotepine

Antiemetics: AS-8112 • Alizapride • Bromopride • Clebopride • Domperidone • Metoclopramide • Thiethylperazine

Others: Amoxapine • Buspirone • Butaclamol • Ecopipam • N-Ethoxycarbonyl-2-ethoxy-1,2-dihydroquinoline (EEDQ) • Eticlopride • Fananserin • L-745,870 • Nafadotride • Nuciferine • PNU-99,194 • Raclopride • Sarizotan • SB-277,011-A • SCH-23,390 • SKF-83,566 • SKF-83,959 • Sonepiprazole • Spiperone • Spiroxatrine • Stepholidine • Tetrahydropalmatine • Tiapride • UH-232 • Yohimbine

== Reuptake inhibitors ==
=== Dopamine transporter (DAT) inhibitors ===
Piperazines: DBL-583 • GBR-12,935 • Nefazodone • Vanoxerine

Piperidines: 1-(1-(1-Benzothiophen-2-yl)cyclohexyl)piperidine (BTCP) • Desoxypipradrol • Dextromethylphenidate • Difemetorex • Ethylphenidate • Methylnaphthidate • Isopropylphenidate • Methylphenidate • Phencyclidine • Pipradrol

Pyrrolidines: Diphenylprolinol • Methylenedioxypyrovalerone (MDPV) • Naphyrone • Prolintane • Pyrovalerone

Tropanes: 3β-(4'-Chlorophenyl)-2β-(3'-phenylisoxazol-5'-yl)tropane (β-CPPIT) • Altropane • Brasofensine • WIN 35428 (β-CFT) • Cocaine • Dichloropane • Difluoropine • N-(2'-Fluoroethyl-)-3β-(4'-chlorophenyl)-2β-(3'-phenylisoxazol-5'-yl)nortropane (FE-β-CPPIT) • N-(3'-Fluoropropyl-)-3β-(4'-chlorophenyl)-2β-(3'-phenylisoxazol-5'-yl)nortropane (FP-β-CPPIT) • Ioflupane (^{123}I) • Iometopane • RTI-112 • RTI-113 • RTI-121 • RTI-126 • RTI-150 • RTI-177 • RTI-229 • RTI-336 • Tenocyclidine • Tesofensine • Troparil • Tropoxane • 2β-Propanoyl-3β-(4-tolyl)-tropane (WF-11) • 2β-Propanoyl-3β-(2-naphthyl)-tropane (WF-23) • 2-Propanoyl-3-(4-isopropylphenyl)-tropane (WF-31) • 2α-(Propanoyl)-3β-(2-(6-methoxynaphthyl))-tropane (WF-33)

Others: Adrafinil • Armodafinil • Amfonelic acid • Amineptine • Benzatropine (benztropine) • Bromantane • 2-Butyl-3-(p-tolyl)quinuclidine (BTQ) • BTS-74,398 • Bupropion (amfebutamone) • Ciclazindol • Diclofensine • Dimethocaine • Diphenylpyraline • Dizocilpine • DOV-102,677 • DOV-21,947 • DOV-216,303 • Etybenzatropine (ethylbenztropine) • EXP-561 • Fencamine • Fencamfamine • Fezolamine • GYKI-52,895 • Hydrafinil • Indatraline • Ketamine • Lefetamine • Levophacetoperane • LR-5182 • Manifaxine • Mazindol • Medifoxamine • Mesocarb • Modafinil • Nefopam • Nomifensine • NS-2359 • O-2172 • Pridefrine • Propylamphetamine • Radafaxine • SEP-225,289 • SEP-227,162 • Sertraline • Sibutramine • Tametraline • Tripelennamine

=== Vesicular monoamine transporter (VMAT) inhibitors ===
Deserpidine • Deutetrabenazine • Ibogaine • Reserpine • Tetrabenazine • Valbenazine

== Dopamine releasing agent ==
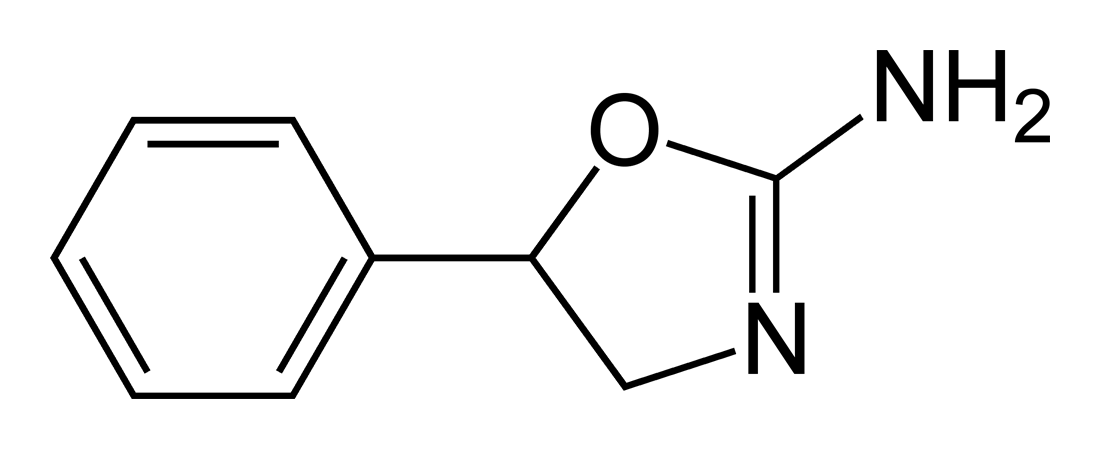
Aminorex

Morpholines: Fenbutrazate • Morazone • Phendimetrazine • Phenmetrazine

Oxazolines: 4-Methylaminorex (4-MAR, 4-MAX) • Aminorex • Clominorex • Cyclazodone • Fenozolone • Fluminorex • Pemoline • Thozalinone

Phenethylamines (also amphetamines, cathinones, phentermines, etc.): 2-Hydroxyphenethylamine (2-OH-PEA) • 4-Chlorophenylisobutylamine (4-CAB) • 4-Methylamphetamine (4-MA) • 4-Methylmethamphetamine (4-MMA) • Alfetamine • Amfecloral • Amfepentorex • Amfepramone • Amphetamine (dextroamphetamine, levoamphetamine) • Amphetaminil • β-Methylphenethylamine (β-Me-PEA) • Benzodioxolylbutanamine (BDB) • Benzodioxolylhydroxybutanamine (BOH) • Benzphetamine • Buphedrone • Butylone • Cathine • Cathinone • Clobenzorex • Clortermine • D-Deprenyl • Dimethoxyamphetamine (DMA) • Dimethoxymethamphetamine (DMMA) • Dimethylamphetamine • Dimethylcathinone (dimethylpropion, metamfepramone) • Ethcathinone (ethylpropion) • Ethylamphetamine • Ethylbenzodioxolylbutanamine (EBDB) • Ethylone • Famprofazone • Fenethylline • Fenproporex • Flephedrone • Fludorex • Furfenorex • Hordenine • Lophophine (homomyristicylamine) • Mefenorex • Mephedrone • Methamphetamine (desoxyephedrine, methedrine; dextromethamphetamine, levomethamphetamine) • Methcathinone (methylpropion) • Methedrone • Methoxymethylenedioxyamphetamine (MMDA) • Methoxymethylenedioxymethamphetamine (MMDMA) • Methylbenzodioxolylbutanamine (MBDB) • Methylenedioxyamphetamine (MDA, tenamfetamine) • Methylenedioxyethylamphetamine (MDEA) • Methylenedioxyhydroxyamphetamine (MDOH) • Methylenedioxymethamphetamine (MDMA) • Methylenedioxymethylphenethylamine (MDMPEA, homarylamine) • Methylenedioxyphenethylamine (MDPEA, homopiperonylamine) • Methylone • Ortetamine • Parabromoamphetamine (PBA) • Parachloroamphetamine (PCA) • Parafluoroamphetamine (PFA) • Parafluoromethamphetamine (PFMA) • Parahydroxyamphetamine (PHA) • Paraiodoamphetamine (PIA) • Paredrine (norpholedrine, oxamphetamine) • Phenethylamine (PEA) • Pholedrine • Phenpromethamine • Prenylamine • Propylamphetamine • Tiflorex (flutiorex) • Tyramine (TRA) • Xylopropamine • Zylofuramine

Piperazines: 2,5-Dimethoxy-4-bromobenzylpiperazine (2C-B-BZP) • Benzylpiperazine (BZP) • Methoxyphenylpiperazine (MeOPP, paraperazine) • Methylbenzylpiperazine (MBZP) • Methylenedioxybenzylpiperazine (MDBZP, piperonylpiperazine)

Others: 2-Amino-1,2-dihydronaphthalene (2-ADN) • 2-Aminoindane (2-AI) • 2-Aminotetralin (2-AT) • 4-Benzylpiperidine (4-BP) • 5-Iodo-2-aminoindane (5-IAI) • Clofenciclan • Cyclopentamine • Cypenamine • Cyprodenate • Feprosidnine • Gilutensin • Heptaminol • Hexacyclonate • Indanylaminopropane (IAP) • Indanorex • Isometheptene • Methylhexanamine • Naphthylaminopropane (NAP) • Octodrine • Phthalimidopropiophenone • Propylhexedrine (levopropylhexedrine) • Tuaminoheptane (tuamine)

== Activity enhancers ==
Benzofuranylpropylaminopentane (BPAP) • Desmethylselegiline • Indolylpropylaminopentane (IPAP) • Phenethylamine • Phenylpropylaminopentane (PPAP) • Selegiline (L-deprenyl) • Tryptamine • Tyramine

=== Phenylalanine hydroxylase inhibitors ===
3,4-Dihydroxystyrene

=== Tyrosine hydroxylase inhibitors ===
3-Iodotyrosine • Aquayamycin • Bulbocapnine • Metirosine • Oudenone

=== Aromatic L-amino acid decarboxylase inhibitors (DOPA decarboxylase inhibitors) ===
Benserazide • Carbidopa • Genistein • Methyldopa

=== Degradation inhibitors ===
==== Monoamine oxidase inhibitors (MAOIs) ====
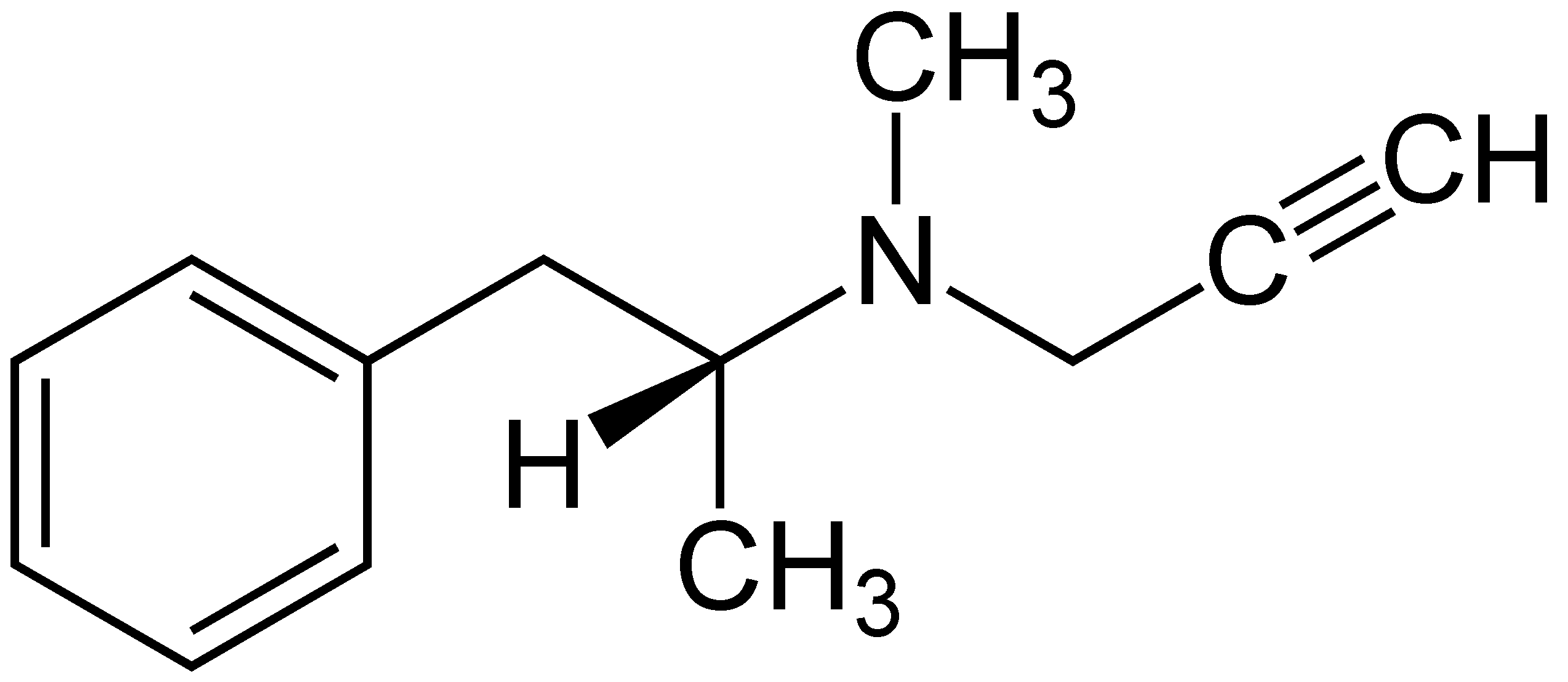
Selegiline

Nonselective: Benmoxin • Caroxazone • Echinopsidine • Furazolidone • Hydralazine • Indantadol • Iproclozide • Iproniazid • Isocarboxazid • Isoniazid • Linezolid • Mebanazine • Metfendrazine • Nialamide • Octamoxin • Paraxazone • Phenelzine • Pheniprazine • Phenoxypropazine • Pivalylbenzhydrazine • Procarbazine • Safrazine • Tranylcypromine

MAO-A selective: Amiflamine • Bazinaprine • Befloxatone • Befol • Brofaromine • Cimoxatone • Clorgiline • Esuprone • Harmala alkaloids (harmine, harmaline, tetrahydroharmine, harman, norharman, etc.) • Methylene blue • Metralindole • Minaprine • Moclobemide • Pirlindole • Sercloremine • Tetrindole • Toloxatone • Tyrima

MAO-B selective: D-Deprenyl • Selegiline (L-deprenyl) • Ladostigil • Lazabemide • Milacemide • Mofegiline • Pargyline • Rasagiline • Safinamide

==== Catechol-O-methyl transferase (COMT) inhibitors ====
Entacapone • Nitecapone • Opicapone • Tolcapone

==== Dopamine beta hydroxylase inhibitors ====
Bupicomide • Disulfiram • Dopastin • Fusaric acid • Nepicastat • Phenopicolinic acid • Tropolone

== Others ==
=== Precursors ===
L-Phenylalanine

L-Phenylalanine → L-tyrosine → L-DOPA (levodopa)

=== Cofactors ===
Ferrous iron (Fe^{2+}) • Tetrahydrobiopterin • Vitamin B_{3} (niacin, nicotinamide → NADPH) • Vitamin B_{6} (pyridoxine, pyridoxamine, pyridoxal → pyridoxal phosphate) • Vitamin B_{9} (folic acid → tetrahydrofolic acid) • Vitamin C (ascorbic acid) • Zinc (Zn^{2+})

=== Neurotoxins ===
MPP^{+} • MPTP • Oxidopamine (6-hydroxydopamine)

=== Levodopa prodrugs ===
Etilevodopa • Foslevodopa • Melevodopa • XP-21279

=== Photopharmacological agents ===
Photopharmacology enables light-controlled modulation of neurotransmitter systems by designing molecules whose activity can be precisely switched on or off using specific wavelengths of light. This approach has recently been extended to the dopaminergic system. A photoswitchable agonist of D_{1}-like receptors (azodopa) has been described that allows reversible control of dopaminergic transmission in wildtype animals. Several others photopharmacological tools have been developed to target dopamine receptors using light-responsive ligands that allow reversible and non-invasive control over receptor activation. These include both photoisomerizable agonists/antagonists and caged dopamine derivatives that release the active compound upon irradiation. Such compounds offer valuable insights into dopamine signaling dynamics and hold promise for the development of experimental therapies for dopaminergic disorders, including Parkinson’s disease and schizophrenia.
