= C18H25N5O4 =

The molecular formula C_{18}H_{25}N_{5}O_{4} (molar mass: 375.42 g/mol, exact mass: 375.1907 u) may refer to:

- Metazosin
- Neldazosin
