= C12H16O3 =

The molecular formula C_{12}H_{16}O_{3} (molar mass : 208.25 g/mol) may refer to:

- Asarone, an ether found in certain plants.
- Elemicin, a constituent of the essential oil of nutmeg.
- Isoelemicin
- Oudenone, a fungal metabolite.
