= C17H23N5O2 =

The molecular formula C_{17}H_{23}N_{5}O_{2} (molar mass: 329.40 g/mol, exact mass: 329.1852 u) may refer to:

- Quinazosin
- Sunepitron (CP-93,393)
