= Adrenergic antagonist =

Type of drug

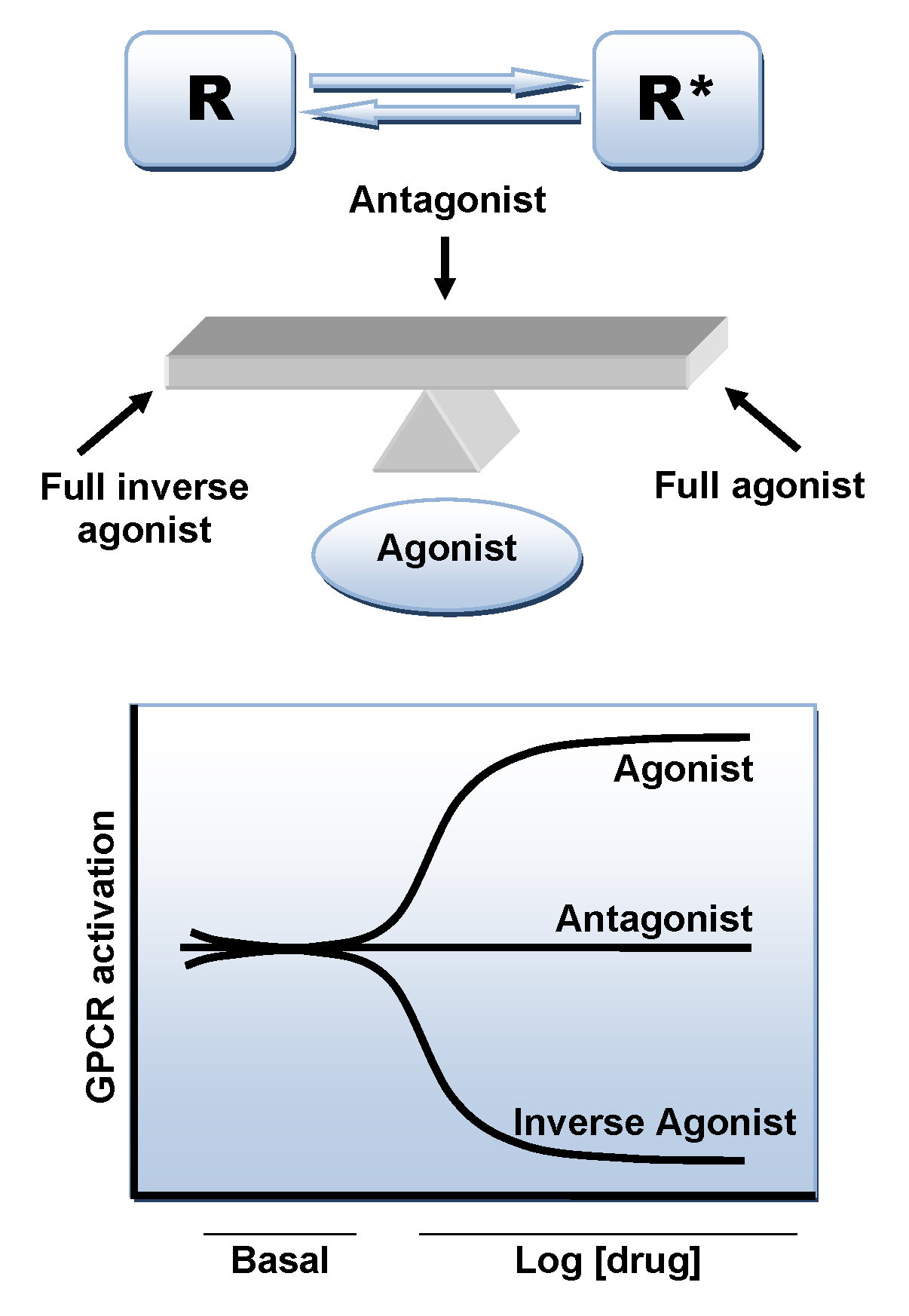
Visual definition of an antagonist, where it compared to agonists and reverse agonists.

An adrenergic antagonist is a drug that inhibits the function of adrenergic receptors. There are five adrenergic receptors, which are divided into two groups. The first group of receptors are the beta (β) adrenergic receptors. There are β_{1}, β_{2}, and β_{3} receptors. The second group contains the alpha (α) adrenoreceptors. There are only α_{1} and α_{2} receptors. Adrenergic receptors are located near the heart, kidneys, lungs, and gastrointestinal tract. There are also α-adreno receptors that are located on vascular smooth muscle.

Antagonists reduce or block the signals of agonists. They can be drugs, which are added to the body for therapeutic reasons, or endogenous ligands. The α-adrenergic antagonists have different effects from the β-adrenergic antagonists.

== Pharmacology ==
Adrenergic ligands are endogenous proteins that modulate and evoke specific cardiovascular effects. Adrenergic antagonists reverse the natural cardiovascular effect, based on the type of adrenoreceptor being blocked. For example, if the natural activation of the α_{1}-adrenergic receptor leads to vasoconstriction, an α_{1}-adrenergic antagonist will result in vasodilation.

Some adrenergic antagonists, mostly β antagonists, passively diffuse from the gastrointestinal tract. From there, they bind to albumin and α1-acid glycoprotein in the plasma, allowing for a wide spread through the body. From there, the lipophilic antagonists are metabolized in the liver and eliminated with urine while the hydrophilic ones are eliminated unchanged.

== Mechanisms of action ==
There are three different types of antagonists.

=== Competitive ===
While only a few α-adrenergic antagonists are competitive, all β-adrenergic antagonists are competitive antagonists. Competitive antagonists are a type of reversible antagonists. A competitive antagonist will attach itself to the same binding site of the receptor that the agonist will bind to. Even though it is in activator region, the antagonist will not activate the receptor. This type of binding is reversible as increasing the concentration of agonist will outcompete the concentration of antagonist, resulting in receptor activation.

Adrenergic competitive antagonists are shorter lasting than the other two types of antagonists. While the antagonists for alpha and beta receptors are usually different compounds, there has been recent drug development that effects both types of the adrenoreceptors.

Phentolamine, an adrenergic antagonist

==== Examples ====
Two examples of competitive adrenergic antagonists are propranolol and phentolamine. Phentolamine is a competitive and nonselective α-adrenoreceptor antagonist. Propranolol is a β-adrenoreceptor antagonist.

=== Non-competitive ===
While competitive antagonists bind to the agonist or ligand binding site of the receptor reversibly, non-competitive antagonists can either bind to the ligand site or other site called the allosteric site. A receptor's agonist does not bind to its allosteric binding site. The binding of a non-competitive antagonist is irreversible. If the non-competitive antagonist binds to the allosteric site and an agonist binds to the ligand site, the receptor will remain unactivated.

An example of an adrenergic non competitive antagonists is phenoxybenzamine. This drug is a non-selective α-adrenergic antagonist, which means it binds to both alpha receptors.

=== Uncompetitive ===
There were few if any adrenergic uncompetitive antagonists. An uncompetitive antagonist is slightly different from the other two types of antagonists. The action of an uncompetitive antagonist is dependent on the receptor's prior activation. This means only after the agonist binds to the receptor can the antagonist block the receptor's function.

== Examples ==
=== Alpha blockers ===
- Phentolamine
- Phenoxybenzamine
- Tamsulosin

=== Beta blockers ===
- Propranolol
- Nebivolol
- Atenolol
- Oxprenolol
- Metoprolol
- Timolol
- Pindolol
- Nadolol
- Pindolol
- Esmolol
- Acebutolol
- Sotalol
- Talinolol
- Betaxolol

=== Mixed action ===
- Labetalol
- Carvedilol

== Major effects ==
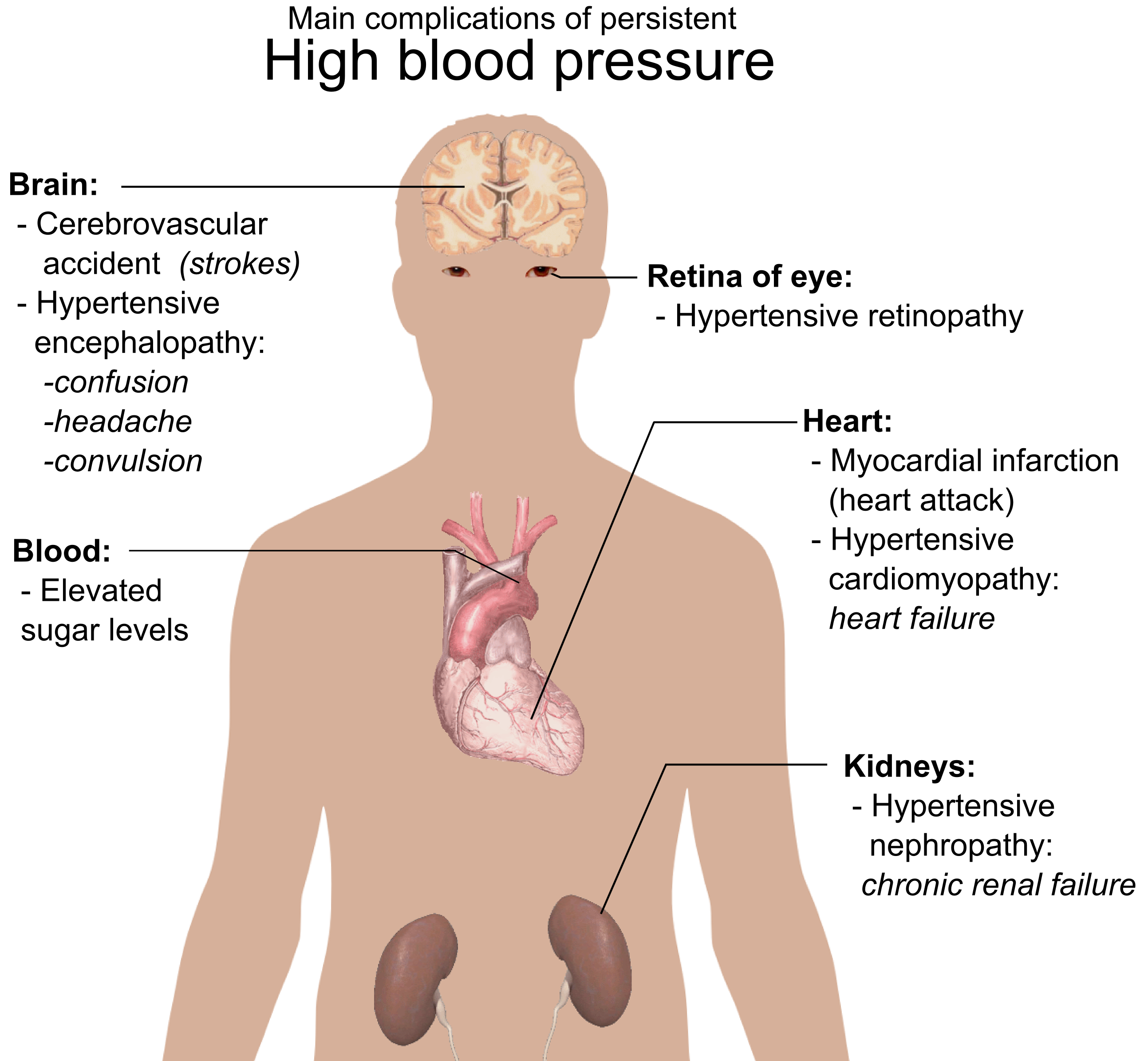
Major complications of persistent high blood pressure, which can be attenuated by adrenergic antagonists.

Adrenergic antagonists have inhibitory or opposing effects on the receptors in the adrenergic system. The adrenergic system modulates the fight-or-flight response. Since this response, which is mostly seen as an increase in blood pressure, is produced by the release of the endogenous adrenergic ligands, administration of an adrenergic antagonist results a decrease in blood pressure, which is controlled by both heart rate and vasculature tone. Administration of an adrenergic antagonist that specifically targets the beta receptors, results in this decrease in blood pressure by slowing or reducing cardiac output.

== Medical uses ==
Adrenergic antagonists are mostly used for cardiovascular disease. The adrenergic antagonists are widely used for lowering blood pressure and relieving hypertension. These antagonists have a been proven to relieve the pain caused by myocardial infarction, and also the infarction size, which correlates with heart rate.

There are few non-cardiovascular uses for adrenergic antagonists. Alpha-adrenergic antagonists are also used for treatment of ureteric stones, pain and panic disorders, withdrawal, and anesthesia.

Adrenergic antagonists are used to treat acute cardiovascular toxicity (e.g. in overdose) caused by sympathomimetics, for instance caused by amphetamine, methamphetamine, cocaine, ephedrine, and other drugs.

== Limitations ==
While these adrenergic antagonists are used for treating cardiovascular disease, mainly hypertension, they can evoke harmful cardiac events through prolongation of the QT interval. Some adrenergic antagonists have a diminished ability to reduce stroke compared to placebo drugs.

== Side effects and toxicity ==
While adrenergic antagonists have been used for years, there are multiple issues with using this class of drug. When overused, adrenergic antagonists can result in bradycardia, hypotension, hyperglycemia and even hypodynamic shock. This is because adrenergic stimulation by agonists results in normal calcium channel regulation. If these adrenergic receptors are blocked too often, there will be an excess in calcium channel inhibition, which causes most of these problems.

== See also ==
- Adrenergic receptor
- Alpha blocker
- Beta blocker
- List of adrenergic drugs
- Propranolol
- Sympathetic nervous system
