= C22H29NO5 =

The molecular formula C_{22}H_{29}NO_{5} (molar mass: 387.47 g/mol) may refer to:

- Eugenodilol
- Trimebutine
