= C14H16ClNO =

The molecular formula C_{14}H_{16}ClNO (molar mass: 249.73594 g/mol, exact mass: 249.0920 u) may refer to:

- Bexlosteride
- Sercloremine (CGP-4718A)
