= Niguldipine =

Names
- IUPAC name 3-3-(4,4-Diphenyl-1-piperidyl)propyl 5-methyl 2,6-dimethyl-4-(m-nitrophenyl)-1,4-dihydropyridine-3,5-dicarboxylate

Identifiers
CAS Number	102993-22-6; 113165-32-5 (S)
3D model (JSmol)	Interactive image
ChEMBL	ChEMBL41929
ChemSpider	1199
PubChem CID	1236
UNII	Z81N45O25Z
CompTox Dashboard (EPA)	DTXSID7048407
- InChI: InChI=1S/C36H39N3O6/c1-25-31(34(40)44-3)33(27-12-10-17-30(24-27)39(42)43)32(26(2)37-25)35(41)45-23-11-20-38-21-18-36(19-22-38,28-13-6-4-7-14-28)29-15-8-5-9-16-29/h4-10,12-17,24,33,37H,11,18-23H2,1-3H3 Key: SVJMLYUFVDMUHP-UHFFFAOYSA-N; InChI=1/C36H39N3O6/c1-25-31(34(40)44-3)33(27-12-10-17-30(24-27)39(42)43)32(26(2)37-25)35(41)45-23-11-20-38-21-18-36(19-22-38,28-13-6-4-7-14-28)29-15-8-5-9-16-29/h4-10,12-17,24,33,37H,11,18-23H2,1-3H3 Key: SVJMLYUFVDMUHP-UHFFFAOYAB
- SMILES: [O-][N+](=O)c1cccc(c1)C5C(/C(=O)OC)=C(\N\C(=C5\C(=O)OCCCN4CCC(c2ccccc2)(c3ccccc3)CC4)C)C

Properties
Chemical formula	C_{36}H_{39}N_{3}O_{6}
Molar mass	609.71136
- Except where otherwise noted, data are given for materials in their standard state (at 25 °C [77 °F], 100 kPa). verify (what is ?) Infobox references

Niguldipine is a calcium channel blocker and α_{1}-adrenergic receptor antagonist.
