= Toloxatone =

Antidepressant

Clinical data
- Routes of administration: Oral
- ATC code: N06AG03 (WHO)

Legal status
- Legal status: In general: uncontrolled

Identifiers
- IUPAC name: 5-(hydroxymethyl)-3-m-tolyloxazolidin-2-one
- CAS Number: 29218-27-7
- PubChem CID: 34521
- ChemSpider: 31769
- UNII: 5T206015T5
- KEGG: D02559
- ChEBI: CHEBI:134870
- ChEMBL: ChEMBL18116
- CompTox Dashboard (EPA): DTXSID40865478
- ECHA InfoCard: 100.045.006

Chemical and physical data
- Formula: C_{11}H_{13}NO_{3}
- Molar mass: 207.229 g·mol^{−1}
- 3D model (JSmol): Interactive image
- SMILES: O=C2OC(CO)CN2c1cccc(c1)C
- InChI: InChI=1S/C11H13NO3/c1-8-3-2-4-9(5-8)12-6-10(7-13)15-11(12)14/h2-5,10,13H,6-7H2,1H3; Key:MXUNKHLAEDCYJL-UHFFFAOYSA-N

Toloxatone (Humoryl) is an antidepressant launched in 1984 in France by Sanofi Aventis for the treatment of depression. It was discontinued in 2002. It acts as a selective reversible inhibitor of MAO-A (RIMA).

== Synthesis ==

The reaction between glycidol (1) and m-toluidine (2) gives 3-m-toluidinopropane-1,2-diol (3). Treatment with diethyl carbonate (4) in the presence of sodium methoxide leads to an intermolecular cycloaddition to give tomoxatone.

== See also ==
- Befloxatone
- Cimoxatone
