= Tiodazosin =

Names
- Preferred IUPAC name [4-(4-Amino-6,7-dimethoxyquinazolin-2-yl)piperazin-1-yl][5-(methylsulfanyl)-1,3,4-oxadiazol-2-yl]methanone

Identifiers
CAS Number	66969-81-1
3D model (JSmol)	Interactive image
ChemSpider	54869
PubChem CID	60891
UNII	FQI0PYJ799
CompTox Dashboard (EPA)	DTXSID90217180
- InChI: InChI=1S/C18H21N7O4S/c1-27-12-8-10-11(9-13(12)28-2)20-17(21-14(10)19)25-6-4-24(5-7-25)16(26)15-22-23-18(29-15)30-3/h8-9H,4-7H2,1-3H3,(H2,19,20,21) Key: MULPYFRDYRZMDS-UHFFFAOYSA-N
- SMILES: COC1=C(C=C2C(=C1)C(=NC(=N2)N3CCN(CC3)C(=O)C4=NN=C(O4)SC)N)OC

Properties
Chemical formula	C_{18}H_{21}N_{7}O_{4}S
Molar mass	431.47 g·mol^{−1}
- Except where otherwise noted, data are given for materials in their standard state (at 25 °C [77 °F], 100 kPa). Infobox references

Tiodazosin is an α_{1}-adrenergic receptor antagonist.

== See also ==
- Terazosin
