= Indoramin =

Chemical compound

Clinical data
- AHFS/Drugs.com: International Drug Names
- ATC code: C02CA02 (WHO)

Identifiers
- IUPAC name: N-{1-[2-(1H-indol-3-yl)ethyl]piperidin-4-yl}benzamide
- CAS Number: 26844-12-2
- PubChem CID: 33625
- IUPHAR/BPS: 501
- DrugBank: DB08950
- ChemSpider: 31014
- UNII: 0Z802HMY7H
- KEGG: D04531
- ChEMBL: ChEMBL279516
- CompTox Dashboard (EPA): DTXSID7048370
- ECHA InfoCard: 100.043.659

Chemical and physical data
- Formula: C_{22}H_{25}N_{3}O
- Molar mass: 347.462 g·mol^{−1}
- 3D model (JSmol): Interactive image
- SMILES: O=C(c1ccccc1)NC4CCN(CCc3c2ccccc2[nH]c3)CC4
- InChI: InChI=1S/C22H25N3O/c26-22(17-6-2-1-3-7-17)24-19-11-14-25(15-12-19)13-10-18-16-23-21-9-5-4-8-20(18)21/h1-9,16,19,23H,10-15H2,(H,24,26); Key:JXZZEXZZKAWDSP-UHFFFAOYSA-N

Indoramin (trade names Baratol and Doralese) is a piperidine antiadrenergic agent.

It is an alpha-1 selective adrenoceptor antagonist with direct myocardial depression action; therefore, it results in no reflex tachycardia. It is also used in benign prostatic hyperplasia (BPH).

It is commonly synthesized from tryptophol.

== Dosage ==
Indoramin is commonly prescribed as 20 mg tablets when used in BPH.

== Side Effects ==
Drowsiness, dizziness, dry mouth, nasal congestion, headache, fatigue, weight gain, hypotension, postural hypotension, depression, problems with ejaculation, diarrhoea, nausea, increased need to pass urine, and palpitations.

== Synthesis ==
Tryptamine and serotonin are naturally occurring indole ethylamino compounds with pronounced pharmacological activities. They have served as the inspiration for synthesis of numerous analogues.

One such study involved alkylation of 4-benzamidopyridine (2) with a bromoethyy compound (1) derived from tryptophol, to give a quaternary pyridinium salt (3); this intermediate was in turn hydrogenated with a Raney nickel catalyst to give indoramine.

== Product withdrawal ==
On May 31, 2013, the French National Agency for the Safety of Medicines and Health Products (ANSM) concluded that the benefit/risk ratio of this product was unfavorable and withdrew Vidora's marketing authorization and recalled its batches from the market on June 3, 2013.
