= Bunazosin =

Chemical compound

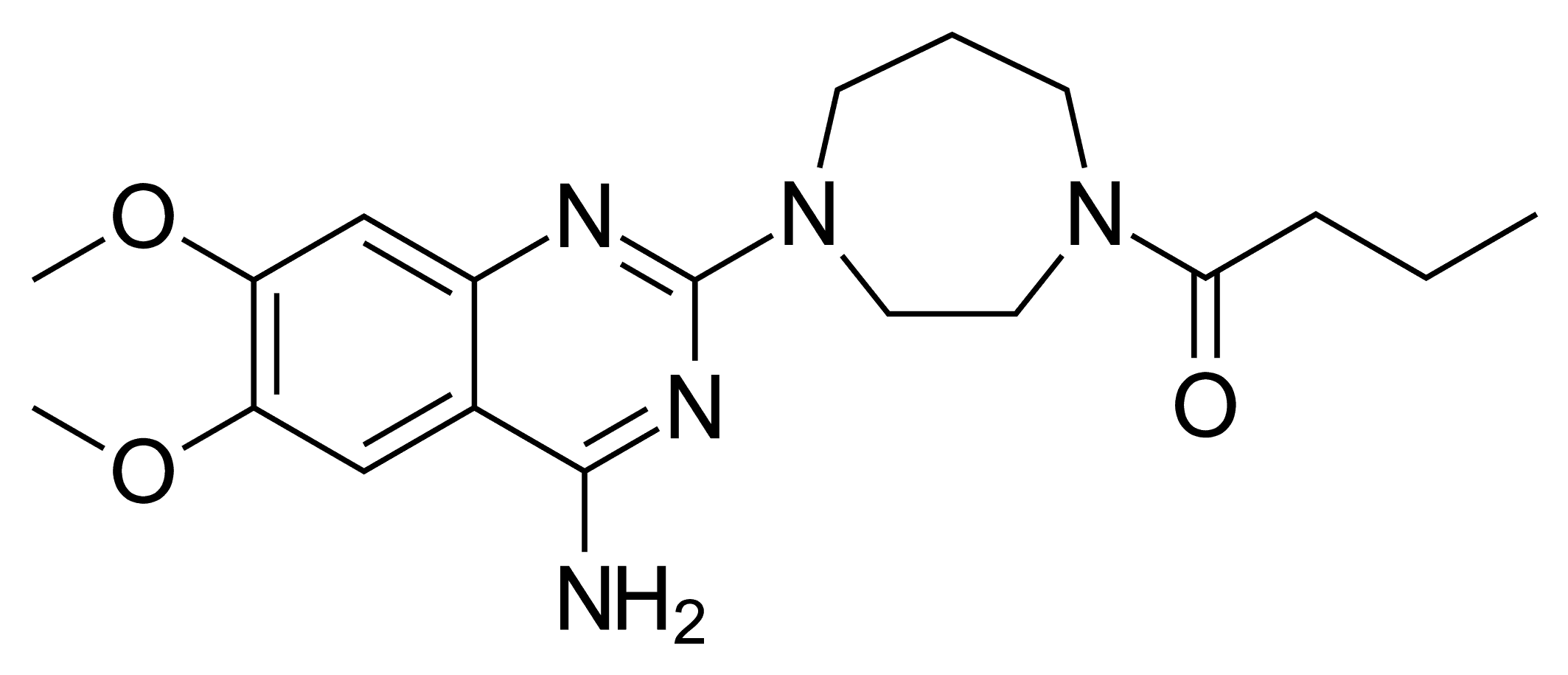

Clinical data
- AHFS/Drugs.com: International Drug Names
- ATC code: none

Identifiers
- IUPAC name: 1-(4-(4-amino-6,7-dimethoxyquinazolin-2-yl)-1,4-diazepan-1-yl)butan-1-one
- CAS Number: 80755-51-7
- PubChem CID: 2472
- ChemSpider: 2378
- UNII: 9UUW4V7G2H
- ChEMBL: ChEMBL188185
- CompTox Dashboard (EPA): DTXSID7022700

Chemical and physical data
- Formula: C_{19}H_{27}N_{5}O_{3}
- Molar mass: 373.457 g·mol^{−1}
- 3D model (JSmol): Interactive image
- SMILES: CCCC(=O)N1CCCN(CC1)C2=NC3=CC(=C(C=C3C(=N2)N)OC)OC
- InChI: InChI=1S/C19H27N5O3/c1-4-6-17(25)23-7-5-8-24(10-9-23)19-21-14-12-16(27-3)15(26-2)11-13(14)18(20)22-19/h11-12H,4-10H2,1-3H3,(H2,20,21,22); Key:RHLJLALHBZGAFM-UHFFFAOYSA-N

Bunazosin (INN) is an α_{1}-adrenergic receptor antagonist. Bunazosin was initially developed to treat benign prostatic hyperplasia (BPH). It has been approved in Japan in a topical form to treat glaucoma. The mechanism of action is a reduction of aqueous outflow through the uveoscleral pathway resulting in lowering the intraocular pressure. It also may act to improve blood flow to the ocular nerve. Systemic Alpha-1 adrenergic receptor antagonists have been implicated in Intraoperative Floppy Iris Syndrome (IFIS). Bunazosin potentially could have the same effect but there has been no research to substantiate this as a risk for cataract surgery.
