= Monatepil =

- Chemical structure of monatepil

Names
- Preferred IUPAC name N-(6,11-Dihydrodibenzo[b,e]thiepin-11-yl)-4-[4-(4-fluorophenyl)piperazin-1-yl]butanamide

Identifiers
CAS Number	103377-41-9
3D model (JSmol)	Interactive image
ChemSpider	54798
KEGG	D01171
PubChem CID	60810
UNII	N4MMI0J7PW
CompTox Dashboard (EPA)	DTXSID3048811
- InChI: InChI=1S/C28H30FN3OS/c29-22-11-13-23(14-12-22)32-18-16-31(17-19-32)15-5-10-27(33)30-28-24-7-2-1-6-21(24)20-34-26-9-4-3-8-25(26)28/h1-4,6-9,11-14,28H,5,10,15-20H2,(H,30,33) Key: WFNRNNUZFPVBSM-UHFFFAOYSA-N
- SMILES: C1CN(CCN1CCCC(=O)NC2C3=CC=CC=C3CSC4=CC=CC=C24)C5=CC=C(C=C5)F

Properties
Chemical formula	C_{28}H_{30}FN_{3}OS
Molar mass	475.63 g·mol^{−1}
- Except where otherwise noted, data are given for materials in their standard state (at 25 °C [77 °F], 100 kPa). Infobox references

Monatepil is a calcium channel blocker and α_{1}-adrenergic receptor antagonist used as an antihypertensive.

== Synthesis ==
The synthesis of monatepil was first disclosed in patents filed by Dainippon Pharmaceutical.

The amino group of the dihydrodibenzothiepin (1) is first reacted with the acid chloride of 4-chlorobutyric acid, to give the amide (3). This is then used to alkylate para-fluorophenylpiperazine (4) to yield monatepil.
