= 6-Fluoronorepinephrine =

Chemical compound

Clinical data
- ATC code: none

Legal status
- Legal status: In general: uncontrolled

Identifiers
- IUPAC name: 4-(2-amino-1-hydroxy-ethyl)-5-fluoro-benzene-1,2-diol
- CAS Number: 86820-21-5
- PubChem CID: 1862
- IUPHAR/BPS: 510
- ChemSpider: 1792
- ChEMBL: ChEMBL281232
- CompTox Dashboard (EPA): DTXSID301007133

Chemical and physical data
- Formula: C_{8}H_{10}FNO_{3}
- Molar mass: 187.170 g·mol^{−1}
- 3D model (JSmol): Interactive image
- SMILES: Fc1cc(O)c(O)cc1C(O)CN
- InChI: InChI=1S/C8H10FNO3/c9-5-2-7(12)6(11)1-4(5)8(13)3-10/h1-2,8,11-13H,3,10H2; Key:SBUQBFTXTZSRMH-UHFFFAOYSA-N

6-Fluoronorepinephrine (6-FNE) is a selective α_{1}- and α_{2}-adrenergic receptor full agonist related to norepinephrine. It is the only selective full agonist for the α-adrenergic receptors known to date and has been used to study their function in scientific research. Infusion of 6-FNE into the locus coeruleus of rodents produces marked hyperactivity and behavioral disinhibition by suppressing activity in the area via stimulation of α_{1}-adrenergic receptors.
