= Isoxaprolol =

Chemical compound

Clinical data
- Other names: LU 27937
- ATC code: None

Identifiers
- IUPAC name: 1-{2-[(E)-2-(3-Methyl-1,2-oxazol-5-yl)vinyl]phenoxy}-3-[(2-methyl-2-propanyl)amino]-2-propanol
- CAS Number: 75949-60-9
- PubChem CID: 6443854
- ChemSpider: 4947811
- UNII: 0Y84EU1HAA
- CompTox Dashboard (EPA): DTXSID001024556

Chemical and physical data
- Formula: C_{19}H_{26}N_{2}O_{3}
- Molar mass: 330.428 g·mol^{−1}
- 3D model (JSmol): Interactive image
- SMILES: CC1=NOC(=C1)/C=C/C2=CC=CC=C2OCC(CNC(C)(C)C)O
- InChI: InChI=1S/C19H26N2O3/c1-14-11-17(24-21-14)10-9-15-7-5-6-8-18(15)23-13-16(22)12-20-19(2,3)4/h5-11,16,20,22H,12-13H2,1-4H3/b10-9+; Key:MOIVIHVEHZGRGG-MDZDMXLPSA-N

Isoxaprolol is an adrenergic antagonist with antiarrhythmic and antihypertensive properties.
