= Benoxathian =

Names
- IUPAC name N-(2,3-Dihydro-1,4-benzoxathiin-2-ylmethyl)-2-(2,6-dimethoxyphenoxy)ethanamine

Identifiers
CAS Number	92642-94-9
3D model (JSmol)	Interactive image
ChemSpider	2235
PubChem CID	2325
CompTox Dashboard (EPA)	DTXSID10919033
- InChI: InChI=1S/C19H23NO4S/c1-21-16-7-5-8-17(22-2)19(16)23-11-10-20-12-14-13-25-18-9-4-3-6-15(18)24-14/h3-9,14,20H,10-13H2,1-2H3 Key: QAUVAHYHKLRJCQ-UHFFFAOYSA-N; InChI=1/C19H23NO4S/c1-21-16-7-5-8-17(22-2)19(16)23-11-10-20-12-14-13-25-18-9-4-3-6-15(18)24-14/h3-9,14,20H,10-13H2,1-2H3 Key: QAUVAHYHKLRJCQ-UHFFFAOYAX
- SMILES: COC1=C(C(=CC=C1)OC)OCCNCC2CSC3=CC=CC=C3O2

Properties
Chemical formula	C_{19}H_{23}NO_{4}S
Molar mass	361.46 g·mol^{−1}
- Except where otherwise noted, data are given for materials in their standard state (at 25 °C [77 °F], 100 kPa). Infobox references

Benoxathian is an α_{1}-adrenergic receptor antagonist. It was studied in animals for its antihypertensive (blood pressure lowering) effects in the 1980s.
