= Amosulalol =

Chemical compound

Clinical data
- AHFS/Drugs.com: International Drug Names
- Routes of administration: Oral
- ATC code: none

Legal status
- Legal status: In general: ℞ (Prescription only)

Identifiers
- IUPAC name: (RS)-5-[1-hydroxy-2-[2-(2-methoxyphenoxy)ethylamino]ethyl]-2-methylbenzenesulfonamide
- CAS Number: 85320-68-9
- PubChem CID: 2169
- ChemSpider: 2084
- UNII: C69JI1BAU8
- KEGG: D07451
- ChEMBL: ChEMBL152231
- CompTox Dashboard (EPA): DTXSID90868893

Chemical and physical data
- Formula: C_{18}H_{24}N_{2}O_{5}S
- Molar mass: 380.46 g·mol^{−1}
- 3D model (JSmol): Interactive image
- SMILES: CC1=C(C=C(C=C1)C(CNCCOC2=CC=CC=C2OC)O)S(=O)(=O)N
- InChI: InChI=1S/C18H24N2O5S/c1-13-7-8-14(11-18(13)26(19,22)23)15(21)12-20-9-10-25-17-6-4-3-5-16(17)24-2/h3-8,11,15,20-21H,9-10,12H2,1-2H3,(H2,19,22,23); Key:LVEXHFZHOIWIIP-UHFFFAOYSA-N

Amosulalol (INN) is an antihypertensive drug. It has much higher affinity for α_{1}-adrenergic receptors than for β-adrenergic receptors. It is not approved for use in the United States.

== Synthesis ==

Guaiacol (1) reacts with ethylene oxide to give 2-(2-methoxyphenoxy)ethanol (2). Halogenation with thionyl chloride converts the alcohol group to a chloride, (3), which is used to alkylate benzylamine (4) to give the secondary amine (5). This forms a tertiary amine (7) when combined with 5-bromoacetyl-2-methylbenzenesulfonamide (6). The reduction of the carbonyl group with sodium borohydride produces (8) and catalytic hydrogenation removes the benzyl group, yielding amosulalol.
