= Abanoquil =

Chemical compound

Clinical data
- ATC code: none

Identifiers
- IUPAC name: 2-(6,7-dimethoxy-3,4-dihydro-1H-isoquinolin-2-yl)-6,7-dimethoxyquinolin-4-amine
- CAS Number: 90402-40-7
- PubChem CID: 164089
- ChemSpider: 143896
- UNII: F738MWY53L
- ChEMBL: ChEMBL324090
- CompTox Dashboard (EPA): DTXSID40238163

Chemical and physical data
- Formula: C_{22}H_{25}N_{3}O_{4}
- Molar mass: 395.459 g·mol^{−1}
- 3D model (JSmol): Interactive image
- SMILES: COC1=C(C=C2CN(CCC2=C1)C3=NC4=CC(=C(C=C4C(=C3)N)OC)OC)OC
- InChI: InChI=1S/C22H25N3O4/c1-26-18-7-13-5-6-25(12-14(13)8-19(18)27-2)22-10-16(23)15-9-20(28-3)21(29-4)11-17(15)24-22/h7-11H,5-6,12H2,1-4H3,(H2,23,24); Key:ANZIISNSHPKVRV-UHFFFAOYSA-N

Abanoquil (INN) is an α1-adrenergic receptor antagonist.

== See also ==
- Alpha blocker
