= Adimolol =

Chemical compound

Clinical data
- ATC code: none

Identifiers
- IUPAC name: 3-[3-[[2-hydroxy-3-(1-naphthyloxy)propyl]amino]-3-methyl-butyl]-1H-benzimidazol-2-one
- CAS Number: 78459-19-5
- PubChem CID: 71227
- ChemSpider: 64362
- UNII: B6CJY5K2ST
- ChEMBL: ChEMBL1742448
- CompTox Dashboard (EPA): DTXSID00868480

Chemical and physical data
- Formula: C_{25}H_{29}N_{3}O_{3}
- Molar mass: 419.525 g·mol^{−1}
- 3D model (JSmol): Interactive image
- SMILES: O=C2Nc1ccccc1N2CCC(NCC(O)COc4c3ccccc3ccc4)(C)C
- InChI: InChI=1S/C25H29N3O3/c1-25(2,14-15-28-22-12-6-5-11-21(22)27-24(28)30)26-16-19(29)17-31-23-13-7-9-18-8-3-4-10-20(18)23/h3-13,19,26,29H,14-17H2,1-2H3,(H,27,30); Key:YWRIUGFSIQMHJK-UHFFFAOYSA-N

Adimolol (developmental code name MEN-935) is antihypertensive agent which acts as a non-selective α_{1}-, α_{2}-, and β-adrenergic receptor antagonist.

== Synthesis ==
The reaction between 1-naphthyl glycidyl ether (1) and 3-(3-amino-3-methylbutyl)-1H-benzimidazol-2-one (2) gives adimolol (3).

Synthesis of adimolol
