= Adaprolol =

Chemical compound

Clinical data
- ATC code: none

Identifiers
- IUPAC name: (±)-2-(1-adamantyl)ethyl 2-[4-[2-hydroxy-3-(propan-2-ylamino)propoxy]phenyl]acetate
- CAS Number: 101479-70-3
- PubChem CID: 60732
- ChemSpider: 4940501
- UNII: XP9911I1WL
- ChEMBL: ChEMBL435170
- CompTox Dashboard (EPA): DTXSID90869360

Chemical and physical data
- Formula: C_{26}H_{39}NO_{4}
- Molar mass: 429.601 g·mol^{−1}
- 3D model (JSmol): Interactive image
- SMILES: O=C(CC1=CC=C(OCC(O)CNC(C)C)C=C1)OCCC23C[C@@H]4C[C@H](C2)C[C@H](C3)C4
- InChI: InChI=1S/C26H39NO4/c1-18(2)27-16-23(28)17-31-24-5-3-19(4-6-24)12-25(29)30-8-7-26-13-20-9-21(14-26)11-22(10-20)15-26/h3-6,18,20-23,27-28H,7-17H2,1-2H3; Key:IPGLIOFIFLXLKR-UHFFFAOYSA-N

Adaprolol is a potent beta-adrenergic antagonist. The drug produces electrophysiologic effects, prolonging basic sinus cycle length and the refractory period of the His-Purkinje system and the ventricles of the heart. It is a soft drug purposed for the treatment of glaucoma. The drug was designed to be quickly and easily metabolized, minimizing systemic activity through facile inactivation into an inactive metabolite.
