= Metazosin =

Names
- IUPAC name 1-[4-(4-Amino-6,7-dimethoxyquinazolin-2-yl)piperazin-1-yl]-2-methoxypropan-1-one
- Other names Kenosin

Identifiers
CAS Number	95549-92-1
3D model (JSmol)	Interactive image
ChemSpider	84417
PubChem CID	93514
UNII	M3MC5CTU0R
CompTox Dashboard (EPA)	DTXSID50878352 DTXSID00275913, DTXSID50878352
- InChI: InChI=1S/C18H25N5O4/c1-11(25-2)17(24)22-5-7-23(8-6-22)18-20-13-10-15(27-4)14(26-3)9-12(13)16(19)21-18/h9-11H,5-8H2,1-4H3,(H2,19,20,21) Key: YEOTYALSMRNXLJ-UHFFFAOYSA-N
- SMILES: CC(C(=O)N1CCN(CC1)C2=NC3=CC(=C(C=C3C(=N2)N)OC)OC)OC

Properties
Chemical formula	C_{18}H_{25}N_{5}O_{4}
Molar mass	375.429 g·mol^{−1}
- Except where otherwise noted, data are given for materials in their standard state (at 25 °C [77 °F], 100 kPa). Infobox references

Metazosin is an antihypertensive α_{1}-adrenergic receptor antagonist.

== Synthesis ==

The amide (3) is formed when piperazine is reacted with 2-methoxypropionylchloride (2). Metazosin is the product when this intermediate is reacted with the substituted quinazoline (4).
