= Dalbraminol =

Chemical compound

Clinical data
- ATC code: none

Identifiers
- IUPAC name: 1-Phenoxy-3-({2-[(1,3,5-trimethyl-1H-pyrazol-4-yl)amino]ethyl}amino)-2-propanol
- CAS Number: 81528-80-5
- PubChem CID: 205958
- ChemSpider: 178459
- UNII: 7GDN12Q42M
- ChEMBL: ChEMBL2106134
- CompTox Dashboard (EPA): DTXSID50868617

Chemical and physical data
- Formula: C_{17}H_{26}N_{4}O_{2}
- Molar mass: 318.421 g·mol^{−1}
- 3D model (JSmol): Interactive image
- SMILES: CC1=C(C(=NN1C)C)NCCNCC(COC2=CC=CC=C2)O
- InChI: InChI=1S/C17H26N4O2/c1-13-17(14(2)21(3)20-13)19-10-9-18-11-15(22)12-23-16-7-5-4-6-8-16/h4-8,15,18-19,22H,9-12H2,1-3H3; Key:CRKZWPJRHFAGCJ-UHFFFAOYSA-N

Dalbraminol is a beta blocker.
