= Quinazosin =

Names
- Preferred IUPAC name 6,7-Dimethoxy-2-[4-(prop-2-en-1-yl)piperazin-1-yl]quinazolin-4-amine

Identifiers
CAS Number	15793-38-1
3D model (JSmol)	Interactive image
ChemSpider	25577
PubChem CID	27486
UNII	436XK6QFMR
CompTox Dashboard (EPA)	DTXSID40166331
- InChI: InChI=1S/C17H23N5O2/c1-4-5-21-6-8-22(9-7-21)17-19-13-11-15(24-3)14(23-2)10-12(13)16(18)20-17/h4,10-11H,1,5-9H2,2-3H3,(H2,18,19,20) Key: HSIPLPKNLDWHSE-UHFFFAOYSA-N; InChI=1/C17H23N5O2/c1-4-5-21-6-8-22(9-7-21)17-19-13-11-15(24-3)14(23-2)10-12(13)16(18)20-17/h4,10-11H,1,5-9H2,2-3H3,(H2,18,19,20) Key: HSIPLPKNLDWHSE-UHFFFAOYAT
- SMILES: COC1=C(C=C2C(=C1)C(=NC(=N2)N3CCN(CC3)CC=C)N)OC

Properties
Chemical formula	C_{17}H_{23}N_{5}O_{2}
Molar mass	329.404 g·mol^{−1}
- Except where otherwise noted, data are given for materials in their standard state (at 25 °C [77 °F], 100 kPa). Infobox references

Quinazosin is an antihypertensive α_{1}-adrenergic receptor antagonist.
