= Tienoxolol =

Names
- IUPAC name Ethyl 2-[3-(tert-butylamino)-2-hydroxypropoxy]-5-(thiophene-2-carbonylamino)benzoate

Identifiers
CAS Number	90055-97-3
3D model (JSmol)	Interactive image
ChemSpider	59107
PubChem CID	65678
UNII	44MR81YQ9R
CompTox Dashboard (EPA)	DTXSID50869043
- InChI: InChI=1S/C21H28N2O5S/c1-5-27-20(26)16-11-14(23-19(25)18-7-6-10-29-18)8-9-17(16)28-13-15(24)12-22-21(2,3)4/h6-11,15,22,24H,5,12-13H2,1-4H3,(H,23,25) Key: PHMRLCQEIQGCHH-UHFFFAOYSA-N; InChI=1/C21H28N2O5S/c1-5-27-20(26)16-11-14(23-19(25)18-7-6-10-29-18)8-9-17(16)28-13-15(24)12-22-21(2,3)4/h6-11,15,22,24H,5,12-13H2,1-4H3,(H,23,25) Key: PHMRLCQEIQGCHH-UHFFFAOYAL
- SMILES: CCOC(=O)C1=C(C=CC(=C1)NC(=O)C2=CC=CS2)OCC(CNC(C)(C)C)O

Properties
Chemical formula	C_{21}H_{28}N_{2}O_{5}S
Molar mass	420.52 g·mol^{−1}
- Except where otherwise noted, data are given for materials in their standard state (at 25 °C [77 °F], 100 kPa). Infobox references

Tienoxolol is a beta adrenergic receptor antagonist.
