= Capsinolol =

Chemical compound

Clinical data
- ATC code: none

Identifiers
- IUPAC name: N-{4-[2-Hydroxy-3-(isopropylamino)propoxy]-3-methoxybenzyl}nonanamide
- CAS Number: 153601-03-7
- PubChem CID: 9887704
- ChemSpider: 8063376
- ChEMBL: ChEMBL366352
- CompTox Dashboard (EPA): DTXSID401031593

Chemical and physical data
- Formula: C_{23}H_{40}N_{2}O_{4}
- Molar mass: 408.583 g·mol^{−1}
- 3D model (JSmol): Interactive image
- SMILES: CCCCCCCCC(=O)NCC1=CC(=C(C=C1)OCC(CNC(C)C)O)OC
- InChI: InChI=1S/C23H40N2O4/c1-5-6-7-8-9-10-11-23(27)25-15-19-12-13-21(22(14-19)28-4)29-17-20(26)16-24-18(2)3/h12-14,18,20,24,26H,5-11,15-17H2,1-4H3,(H,25,27); Key:REOKPCLNKKXKDT-UHFFFAOYSA-N

Capsinolol is a beta blocker derived from nonivamide. It is the first beta blocker with an associated calcitonin gene-related peptide releasing activity in the heart.
