= Ethylnorepinephrine =

Chemical compound

Clinical data
- Other names: β,3,4-Trihydroxy-α-ethyl-2-phenylethylamine
- ATC code: None

Legal status
- Legal status: In general: ℞ (Prescription only)

Identifiers
- IUPAC name: 4-(2-amino-1-hydroxybutyl)benzene-1,2-diol
- CAS Number: 536-24-3
- PubChem CID: 18538
- ChemSpider: 17508
- UNII: M6AY4VCZ0A
- ChEMBL: ChEMBL31159
- CompTox Dashboard (EPA): DTXSID10968369

Chemical and physical data
- Formula: C_{10}H_{15}NO_{3}
- Molar mass: 197.234 g·mol^{−1}
- 3D model (JSmol): Interactive image
- SMILES: Oc1ccc(cc1O)C(O)C(N)CC
- InChI: InChI=1S/C10H15NO3/c1-2-7(11)10(14)6-3-4-8(12)9(13)5-6/h3-5,7,10,12-14H,2,11H2,1H3; Key:LENNRXOJHWNHSD-UHFFFAOYSA-N

Ethylnorepinephrine, sold under the brand names Etanor, Bronkephrine, and Butanefrine, is a sympathomimetic and bronchodilator medication related to norepinephrine. It activates both α and β adrenergic receptors.

Patent:

== See also ==
- Isoetarine
- Colterol
