= Buflomedil =

Clinical data
- Drug class: Alpha-1 blocker; Alpha-2 blocker; Weak calcium channel blocker
- ATC code: C04AX20 (WHO)

Identifiers
- IUPAC name: 4-(pyrrolidin-1-yl)-1-(2,4,6-trimethoxyphenyl)butan-1-one
- CAS Number: 55837-25-7
- PubChem CID: 2467
- ChemSpider: 2373
- UNII: V7I71DQ432
- ChEMBL: ChEMBL188921
- CompTox Dashboard (EPA): DTXSID5022697
- ECHA InfoCard: 100.054.393

Chemical and physical data
- Formula: C_{17}H_{25}NO_{4}
- Molar mass: 307.390 g·mol^{−1}
- 3D model (JSmol): Interactive image
- SMILES: O=C(c1c(OC)cc(OC)cc1OC)CCCN2CCCC2
- InChI: InChI=1S/C17H25NO4/c1-20-13-11-15(21-2)17(16(12-13)22-3)14(19)7-6-10-18-8-4-5-9-18/h11-12H,4-10H2,1-3H3; Key:OWYLAEYXIQKAOL-UHFFFAOYSA-N

Buflomedil, sold under the brand name Loftyl, is a vasoactive drug used to treat claudication or the symptoms of peripheral arterial disease. It is currently not approved by the Food and Drug Administration (FDA) for use in the United States.

== Pharmacology ==
Buflomedil acts as a non-selective or dual α_{1}- and α_{2}-adrenergic receptor antagonist and as a weak calcium channel blocker.

== Toxicity ==
This drug has been suspended from marketing in the European Union, because of concerns about severe neurological and cardiac toxicity. In its press release dated 17 November 2011 EMA suggested that doctors "should stop using buflomedil and consider alternative treatment options". The European Commission advised all member states to revoke marketing authorisation.

Various adverse effects have been reported to the FDA.

== Synthesis ==
Patent: China1 China2

Acylation between 1,3,5-trimethoxybenzene [621-23-8] (1) and 4-pyrrolidinobutyronitrile [35543-25-0] (2) occurs in chlorobenzene solvent in the presence of gaseous hydrochloric acid to give Bufomedil (3). This is a demonstration of the Hoesch reaction.
