= Ridazolol =

Names
- IUPAC name 5-Chloro-4-[2-[[3-(2-chlorophenoxy)-2-hydroxypropyl]amino]ethylamino]-1H-pyridazin-6-one

Identifiers
CAS Number	83395-21-5
3D model (JSmol)	Interactive image
ChEMBL	ChEMBL1742443
ChemSpider	64393
PubChem CID	71265
UNII	2R4QO1868Y
CompTox Dashboard (EPA)	DTXSID301024674
- InChI: InChI=1S/C15H18Cl2N4O3/c16-11-3-1-2-4-13(11)24-9-10(22)7-18-5-6-19-12-8-20-21-15(23)14(12)17/h1-4,8,10,18,22H,5-7,9H2,(H2,19,21,23) Key: UUWABVCZFXKHSU-UHFFFAOYSA-N; InChI=1/C15H18Cl2N4O3/c16-11-3-1-2-4-13(11)24-9-10(22)7-18-5-6-19-12-8-20-21-15(23)14(12)17/h1-4,8,10,18,22H,5-7,9H2,(H2,19,21,23) Key: UUWABVCZFXKHSU-UHFFFAOYAL
- SMILES: C1=CC=C(C(=C1)OCC(CNCCNC2=C(C(=O)NN=C2)Cl)O)Cl

Properties
Chemical formula	C_{15}H_{18}Cl_{2}N_{4}O_{3}
Molar mass	373.23 g·mol^{−1}
- Except where otherwise noted, data are given for materials in their standard state (at 25 °C [77 °F], 100 kPa). Infobox references

Ridazolol is a pharmaceutical drug acting as a beta adrenergic receptor antagonist. It was investigated in the 1980 and 90s for its effects on coronary heart disease and essential hypertension (high blood pressure).

It is not known to be marketed anywhere in the world.
