= FE-β-CPPIT =

Cocaine analogue

Clinical data
- Other names: N-(2'-Fluoroethyl)-3β-(4'-chlorophenyl)-2β-(3'-phenylisoxazol-5'-yl)nortropane

Identifiers
- IUPAC name: (1R,2S,3S,5S)-3-(4-chlorophenyl)-8-(2-fluoroethyl)-2-(3-phenylisoxazol-5-yl)-8-azabicyclo[3.2.1]octane
- PubChem CID: 165365647
- CompTox Dashboard (EPA): DTXSID401045760

Chemical and physical data
- Formula: C_{24}H_{24}ClFN_{2}O
- Molar mass: 410.92 g·mol^{−1}
- 3D model (JSmol): Interactive image
- SMILES: Clc1ccc(cc1)[C@H]5C[C@@H]2CC[C@@H](N2CCF)[C@H]5c3cc(no3)c4ccccc4
- InChI: InChI=1S/C24H24ClFN2O/c25-18-8-6-16(7-9-18)20-14-19-10-11-22(28(19)13-12-26)24(20)23-15-21(27-29-23)17-4-2-1-3-5-17/h1-9,15,19-20,22,24H,10-14H2/t19-,20+,22+,24-/m0/s1; Key:VPVMEJDVQFHAIC-IKJKNFHUSA-N

N-(2'-Fluoroethyl-)-3β-(4'-chlorophenyl)-2β-(3'-phenylisoxazol-5'-yl)nortropane (FE-β-CPPIT) is a cocaine analogue.

== See also ==
- List of cocaine analogues
