= Falintolol =

Names
- Preferred IUPAC name (2Ξ)-1-(tert-Butylamino)-3-{[(E)-(1-cyclopropylethylidene)amino]oxy}propan-2-ol

Identifiers
| CAS Number | 106401-52-9 |
| 3D model (JSmol) | Interactive image |
| ChEMBL | ChEMBL111103 |
| ChemSpider | 16736664 |
| PubChem CID | 6917762 |
| UNII | 82MXJ61S2D |
| CompTox Dashboard (EPA) | DTXSID301024755 |
- InChI: InChI=1S/C12H24N2O2/c1-9(10-5-6-10)14-16-8-11(15)7-13-12(2,3)4/h10-11,13,15H,5-8H2,1-4H3/b14-9+ Key: IYQDIWRBEQWANY-NTEUORMPSA-N
- SMILES: C/C(=N\OCC(CNC(C)(C)C)O)/C1CC1

Properties
| Chemical formula | C_{12}H_{24}N_{2}O_{2} |
| Molar mass | 228.336 g·mol^{−1} |
- Except where otherwise noted, data are given for materials in their standard state (at 25 °C [77 °F], 100 kPa). Infobox references

Falintolol is a beta-adrenergic receptor antagonist.
