= Flestolol =

Names
- IUPAC name 3-{[1-(Carbamoylamino)-2-methyl-2-propanyl]amino}-2-hydroxypropyl 2-fluorobenzoate

Identifiers
CAS Number	87721-62-8
3D model (JSmol)	Interactive image
ChemSpider	50465
KEGG	D04190
PubChem CID	55885
UNII	LI02075E1W
CompTox Dashboard (EPA)	DTXSID60868981
- InChI: InChI=1S/C15H22FN3O4/c1-15(2,9-18-14(17)22)19-7-10(20)8-23-13(21)11-5-3-4-6-12(11)16/h3-6,10,19-20H,7-9H2,1-2H3,(H3,17,18,22) Key: ZPLOQFLCMVIWRY-UHFFFAOYSA-N
- SMILES: CC(C)(CNC(=O)N)NCC(COC(=O)C1=CC=CC=C1F)O

Properties
Chemical formula	C_{15}H_{22}FN_{3}O_{4}
Molar mass	327.356 g·mol^{−1}
- Except where otherwise noted, data are given for materials in their standard state (at 25 °C [77 °F], 100 kPa). Infobox references

Flestolol is a short-acting beta adrenergic receptor antagonist.

== Synthesis ==
ChemDrug Synthesis: Patent:

Acylation of acid chloride 2-Fluorobenzoyl chloride [393-52-2] (1) with glycidol (2) produces the ester 2,3-Epoxypropyl 2-Fluorobenzoate [85515-51-1] (3). Reaction of that intermediate with amine (2-Amino-2-methyl-propyl)-urea [87484-83-1] (4) obtained by reaction of 1,1-dimethylethylenediamine with urea, gives flestolol (5).
