= Ecastolol =

Chemical compound

Clinical data
- ATC code: None

Identifiers
- IUPAC name: N-[4-(3-{[2-(3,4-Dimethoxyphenyl)ethyl]amino}-2-hydroxypropoxy)-3-(1,2-oxazol-5-yl)phenyl]butanamide
- CAS Number: 77695-52-4
- PubChem CID: 208905
- ChemSpider: 181003
- UNII: EEB95DS30P
- ChEMBL: ChEMBL1121343
- CompTox Dashboard (EPA): DTXSID10998909

Chemical and physical data
- Formula: C_{26}H_{33}N_{3}O_{6}
- Molar mass: 483.565 g·mol^{−1}
- 3D model (JSmol): Interactive image
- SMILES: CCCC(=O)NC1=CC(=C(C=C1)OCC(CNCCC2=CC(=C(C=C2)OC)OC)O)C3=CC=NO3
- InChI: InChI=1S/C26H33N3O6/c1-4-5-26(31)29-19-7-9-22(21(15-19)23-11-13-28-35-23)34-17-20(30)16-27-12-10-18-6-8-24(32-2)25(14-18)33-3/h6-9,11,13-15,20,27,30H,4-5,10,12,16-17H2,1-3H3,(H,29,31); Key:CGUIWXDBHIFQJV-UHFFFAOYSA-N

Ecastolol is a beta blocker.
