= Draquinolol =

Chemical compound

Clinical data
- ATC code: none

Identifiers
- IUPAC name: 3-(4-{2-Hydroxy-3-[(2-methyl-2-propanyl)amino]propoxy}phenyl)-7-methoxy-2-methyl-1(2H)-isoquinolinone
- CAS Number: 67793-71-9
- PubChem CID: 10070156
- ChemSpider: 8245696
- UNII: K3B3L3Q0GV
- CompTox Dashboard (EPA): DTXSID301024412

Chemical and physical data
- Formula: C_{24}H_{30}N_{2}O_{4}
- Molar mass: 410.514 g·mol^{−1}
- 3D model (JSmol): Interactive image
- SMILES: CC(C)(C)NCC(COC1=CC=C(C=C1)C2=CC3=C(C=C(C=C3)OC)C(=O)N2C)O
- InChI: InChI=1S/C24H30N2O4/c1-24(2,3)25-14-18(27)15-30-19-9-6-16(7-10-19)22-12-17-8-11-20(29-5)13-21(17)23(28)26(22)4/h6-13,18,25,27H,14-15H2,1-5H3; Key:MZELTXWHFDTAOO-UHFFFAOYSA-N

Draquinolol is a beta blocker with selectivity for the β_{1} receptor.
