= Fenmetozole =

Chemical compound

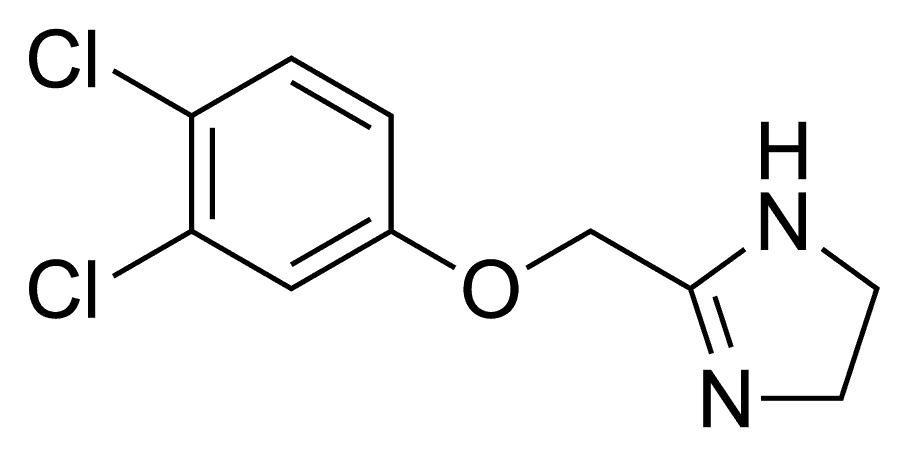

Clinical data
- ATC code: None

Identifiers
- IUPAC name: 2-[(3,4-dichlorophenoxy)methyl]-4,5-dihydro-1H-imidazole
- CAS Number: 41473-09-0 23712-05-2 (HCl)
- PubChem CID: 32049
- ChemSpider: 29721
- UNII: C15WFN6GMO
- ChEMBL: ChEMBL50472
- CompTox Dashboard (EPA): DTXSID40194371

Chemical and physical data
- Formula: C_{10}H_{10}Cl_{2}N_{2}O
- Molar mass: 245.10 g·mol^{−1}
- 3D model (JSmol): Interactive image
- SMILES: Clc2ccc(OCC/1=N/CCN\1)cc2Cl

Fenmetozole (DH-524) is a drug which was patented as an antidepressant, but was later studied as an antagonist of the effects of ethanol, though results were poor and it even increased its effects in some cases. It acts as an α_{2}-adrenergic receptor antagonist similarly to other imidazoles like idazoxan. It was never marketed.

Fenoxazoline has the precise same formula, albeit instead of the 3',4'-dich, an ortho-isopropyl group was chosen instead.
