= Pafenolol =

Names
- IUPAC name 1-[2-[4-[2-Hydroxy-3-(propan-2-ylamino)propoxy]phenyl]ethyl]-3-propan-2-ylurea

Identifiers
CAS Number	80015-07-2
3D model (JSmol)	Interactive image
ChemSpider	64289
PubChem CID	71144
CompTox Dashboard (EPA)	DTXSID20868386
- InChI: InChI=1S/C18H31N3O3/c1-13(2)20-11-16(22)12-24-17-7-5-15(6-8-17)9-10-19-18(23)21-14(3)4/h5-8,13-14,16,20,22H,9-12H2,1-4H3,(H2,19,21,23); InChI=1/C18H31N3O3/c1-13(2)20-11-16(22)12-24-17-7-5-15(6-8-17)9-10-19-18(23)21-14(3)4/h5-8,13-14,16,20,22H,9-12H2,1-4H3,(H2,19,21,23) Key: PKWZWSXSCKVUJB-UHFFFAOYAJ
- SMILES: CC(C)NCC(COC1=CC=C(C=C1)CCNC(=O)NC(C)C)O

Properties
Chemical formula	C_{18}H_{31}N_{3}O_{3}
Molar mass	337.464 g·mol^{−1}
- Except where otherwise noted, data are given for materials in their standard state (at 25 °C [77 °F], 100 kPa). Infobox references

Pafenolol is a beta adrenergic receptor antagonist.
