= Indopanolol =

Chemical compound

Clinical data
- ATC code: None

Identifiers
- IUPAC name: 1-[(3-Chloro-2-methyl-1H-indol-4-yl)oxy]-3-(2-phenoxyethylamino)propan-2-ol
- CAS Number: 69907-17-1
- PubChem CID: 13034801
- ChemSpider: 14462949
- UNII: 2JQ3661CAD
- CompTox Dashboard (EPA): DTXSID501031596

Chemical and physical data
- Formula: C_{20}H_{23}ClN_{2}O_{3}
- Molar mass: 374.87 g·mol^{−1}
- 3D model (JSmol): Interactive image
- SMILES: CC1=C(C2=C(N1)C=CC=C2OCC(CNCCOC3=CC=CC=C3)O)Cl
- InChI: InChI=1S/C20H23ClN2O3/c1-14-20(21)19-17(23-14)8-5-9-18(19)26-13-15(24)12-22-10-11-25-16-6-3-2-4-7-16/h2-9,15,22-24H,10-13H2,1H3; Key:KTODVGFADXOWDU-UHFFFAOYSA-N

Indopanolol is a beta blocker.
