= Sulfinalol =

Names
- IUPAC name 4-[1-Hydroxy-2-[4-(4-methoxyphenyl)butan-2-ylamino]ethyl]-2-methylsulfinylphenol

Identifiers
CAS Number	66264-77-5
3D model (JSmol)	Interactive image
ChEBI	CHEBI:135585
ChEMBL	ChEMBL424518
ChemSpider	40437
PubChem CID	44439
UNII	PH7O14792O
CompTox Dashboard (EPA)	DTXSID80867219
- InChI: InChI=1S/C20H27NO4S/c1-14(4-5-15-6-9-17(25-2)10-7-15)21-13-19(23)16-8-11-18(22)20(12-16)26(3)24/h6-12,14,19,21-23H,4-5,13H2,1-3H3 Key: PAQZZCOZHPGCFW-UHFFFAOYSA-N
- SMILES: CC(CCC1=CC=C(C=C1)OC)NCC(C2=CC(=C(C=C2)O)S(=O)C)O

Properties
Chemical formula	C_{20}H_{27}NO_{4}S
Molar mass	377.50 g·mol^{−1}
- Except where otherwise noted, data are given for materials in their standard state (at 25 °C [77 °F], 100 kPa). Infobox references

Sulfinalol is a beta adrenergic receptor antagonist.

== Synthesis ==
Sulfinalol synthesis:

The preparation of sulfinalol begins by protection of the phenolic hydroxyl as its benzoate ester. Bromination followed by condensation with 4-(4-methoxyphenyl)butan-2-amine gives the amino ketone 3. Successive catalytic reduction and saponification affords amino alcohol 4. Oxidation of the sulfide to the sulfoxide with a reagent such as metaperiodate gives sulfinalol (5).

The methyl group on a sulfoxide is sufficiently acidic to substitute for phenolic hydroxyl.
