= Ersentilide =

Names
- IUPAC name N-[4-[2-Hydroxy-3-[2-(4-imidazol-1-ylphenoxy)ethylamino]propoxy]phenyl]methanesulfonamide

Identifiers
CAS Number	125228-82-2
3D model (JSmol)	Interactive image
ChEMBL	ChEMBL99585
ChemSpider	115376
PubChem CID	130400
- InChI: InChI=1S/C21H26N4O5S/c1-31(27,28)24-17-2-6-21(7-3-17)30-15-19(26)14-22-11-13-29-20-8-4-18(5-9-20)25-12-10-23-16-25/h2-10,12,16,19,22,24,26H,11,13-15H2,1H3 Key: QZWUQVSQIFFFKY-UHFFFAOYSA-N
- SMILES: CS(=O)(=O)NC1=CC=C(C=C1)OCC(CNCCOC2=CC=C(C=C2)N3C=CN=C3)O

Properties
Chemical formula	C_{21}H_{26}N_{4}O_{5}S
Molar mass	446.52 g·mol^{−1}
- Except where otherwise noted, data are given for materials in their standard state (at 25 °C [77 °F], 100 kPa). Infobox references

Ersentilide is a beta adrenergic receptor antagonist.
