= Zolertine =

Names
- IUPAC name 1-Phenyl-4-[2-(tetrazol-5-yl)ethyl]piperazine

Identifiers
CAS Number	4004-94-8
3D model (JSmol)	Interactive image
ChemSpider	22131
PubChem CID	23669
UNII	EMD433OT6A
CompTox Dashboard (EPA)	DTXSID70863301
- InChI: InChI=1S/C13H18N6/c1-2-4-12(5-3-1)19-10-8-18(9-11-19)7-6-13-14-16-17-15-13/h1-5H,6-11H2,(H,14,15,16,17) Key: XTTHMUYLNLEJRS-UHFFFAOYSA-N; InChI=1/C13H18N6/c1-2-4-12(5-3-1)19-10-8-18(9-11-19)7-6-13-14-16-17-15-13/h1-5H,6-11H2,(H,14,15,16,17) Key: XTTHMUYLNLEJRS-UHFFFAOYAE
- SMILES: C1CN(CCN1CCC2=NNN=N2)C3=CC=CC=C3

Properties
Chemical formula	C_{13}H_{18}N_{6}
Molar mass	258.329 g·mol^{−1}
- Except where otherwise noted, data are given for materials in their standard state (at 25 °C [77 °F], 100 kPa). Infobox references

Zolertine is an alpha-1 adrenoceptor antagonist.
