= Befunolol =

Chemical compound

Clinical data
- Trade names: Benfuran, Bentos, Betaclar, Glauconex
- AHFS/Drugs.com: International Drug Names
- ATC code: S01ED06 (WHO)

Identifiers
- IUPAC name: (RS)-1-{7-[2-hydroxy-3-(propan-2-ylamino)propoxy]- 1-benzofuran-2-yl}ethanone
- CAS Number: 39552-01-7
- PubChem CID: 2309
- DrugBank: DB09013
- ChemSpider: 2219
- UNII: 418546MT3A
- KEGG: D07496
- ChEMBL: ChEMBL153984
- CompTox Dashboard (EPA): DTXSID80865957

Chemical and physical data
- Formula: C_{16}H_{21}NO_{4}
- Molar mass: 291.347 g·mol^{−1}
- 3D model (JSmol): Interactive image
- SMILES: O=C(c2oc1c(OCC(O)CNC(C)C)cccc1c2)C
- InChI: InChI=1S/C16H21NO4/c1-10(2)17-8-13(19)9-20-14-6-4-5-12-7-15(11(3)18)21-16(12)14/h4-7,10,13,17,19H,8-9H2,1-3H3; Key:ZPQPDBIHYCBNIG-UHFFFAOYSA-N

Befunolol (INN) is a beta blocker with intrinsic sympathomimetic activity used in the management of open-angle glaucoma. It also acts as a β adrenoreceptor partial agonist. Befunolol was introduced in Japan in 1983 by Kakenyaku Kako Co. under the trade name Bentos.

== Synthesis ==

The first reported synthesis of befunolol in 1974 used a benzofuran derivative (4) with epichlorohydrin and then isopropylamine to add the sidechain which was known to produce beta blockers, by analogy with drugs discovered by Imperial Chemical Industries, such as propanolol. The requisite intermediate was synthesized from ortho-vanillin (1) by a condensation reaction with chloroacetone (2) in the presence of potassium hydroxide, giving 2-acetyl-7-methoxybenzofuran (3), which was demethylated using hydrobromic acid.
