= FP-β-CPPIT =

Cocaine analogue

Clinical data
- Other names: N-(3'-Fluoropropyl)-3β-(4'-chlorophenyl)-2β-(3'-phenylisoxazol-5'-yl)nortropane

Identifiers
- IUPAC name: (1R,2S,3S,5S)-3-(4-chlorophenyl)-8-(3-fluoropropyl)-2-(3-phenylisoxazol-5-yl)-8-azabicyclo[3.2.1]octane
- PubChem CID: 165360176
- ChemSpider: 129561958
- CompTox Dashboard (EPA): DTXSID701045795

Chemical and physical data
- Formula: C_{25}H_{26}ClFN_{2}O
- Molar mass: 424.94 g·mol^{−1}
- 3D model (JSmol): Interactive image
- SMILES: Clc1ccc(cc1)[C@H]5C[C@@H]2CC[C@@H](N2CCCF)[C@H]5c3cc(no3)c4ccccc4
- InChI: InChI=1S/C25H26ClFN2O/c26-19-9-7-17(8-10-19)21-15-20-11-12-23(29(20)14-4-13-27)25(21)24-16-22(28-30-24)18-5-2-1-3-6-18/h1-3,5-10,16,20-21,23,25H,4,11-15H2/t20-,21+,23+,25-/m0/s1; Key:PEFGYCYPBHWUJP-JIEYXDDVSA-N

N-(3'-Fluoropropyl-)-3β-(4'-chlorophenyl)-2β-(3'-phenylisoxazol-5'-yl)nortropane (FP-β-CPPIT) is a cocaine analogue.

== See also ==
- List of cocaine analogues
