= Tazolol =

Chemical compound

Clinical data
- ATC code: none

Identifiers
- CAS Number: 39832-48-9
- PubChem CID: 71721
- ChemSpider: 64770
- UNII: B64Q38TX4G
- CompTox Dashboard (EPA): DTXSID80865972

Chemical and physical data
- Formula: C_{9}H_{16}N_{2}O_{2}S
- Molar mass: 216.30 g·mol^{−1}
- 3D model (JSmol): Interactive image
- SMILES: CC(C)NCC(COC1=NC=CS1)O

Tazolol is a beta blocker with some utility in the treatment of heart disease.

== See also ==
- Timolol
- Niridazole
- Fenclozic acid
