= Butofilolol =

Chemical compound

Clinical data
- Other names: CM-6805
- ATC code: none

Identifiers
- IUPAC name: (RS)-1-[2-[3-(tert-butylamino)-2-hydroxypropoxy]-5-fluorophenyl]butan-1-one
- CAS Number: 58930-32-8
- PubChem CID: 68838
- ChemSpider: 62071
- UNII: 4AZC6Y5A8G
- ChEMBL: ChEMBL157443
- CompTox Dashboard (EPA): DTXSID30867082
- ECHA InfoCard: 100.055.892

Chemical and physical data
- Formula: C_{17}H_{26}FNO_{3}
- Molar mass: 311.397 g·mol^{−1}
- 3D model (JSmol): Interactive image
- SMILES: Fc1ccc(OCC(O)CNC(C)(C)C)c(c1)C(=O)CCC
- InChI: InChI=1S/C17H26FNO3/c1-5-6-15(21)14-9-12(18)7-8-16(14)22-11-13(20)10-19-17(2,3)4/h7-9,13,19-20H,5-6,10-11H2,1-4H3; Key:NMBNQRJDEPOXCP-UHFFFAOYSA-N

Butofilolol (trade name Cafide) is a beta-blocker drug for the treatment of essential hypertension (high blood pressure). It is not known to be marketed anywhere.

It is an example of a butyrophenone.

== Synthesis ==

The Fries rearrangement of the ester formed by 4-fluorophenol (1) and butryryl chloride (2) gives 5'-fluoro-2'-hydroxybutyrophenone (3). Treatment with epichlorohydrin in the presence of base leads to 1-[5-fluoro-2-(oxiranylmethoxy)phenyl]butan-1-one (4). Lastly, reaction with tert-butylamine gives butofilolol.
