= Flusoxolol =

Names
- IUPAC name (2S)-1-[4-[2-[2-(4-Fluorophenyl)ethoxy]ethoxy]phenoxy]-3-(propan-2-ylamino)propan-2-ol

Identifiers
CAS Number	84057-96-5
3D model (JSmol)	Interactive image
ChEMBL	ChEMBL1742476
ChemSpider	64804
PubChem CID	71765
UNII	1GPL60IRCI
- InChI: InChI=1S/C22H30FNO4/c1-17(2)24-15-20(25)16-28-22-9-7-21(8-10-22)27-14-13-26-12-11-18-3-5-19(23)6-4-18/h3-10,17,20,24-25H,11-16H2,1-2H3/t20-/m0/s1 Key: CYCXZGUVPDRYLG-FQEVSTJZSA-N; InChI=1/C22H30FNO4/c1-17(2)24-15-20(25)16-28-22-9-7-21(8-10-22)27-14-13-26-12-11-18-3-5-19(23)6-4-18/h3-10,17,20,24-25H,11-16H2,1-2H3/t20-/m0/s1 Key: CYCXZGUVPDRYLG-FQEVSTJZBA
- SMILES: CC(C)NC[C@@H](COc1ccc(cc1)OCCOCCc2ccc(cc2)F)O

Properties
Chemical formula	C_{22}H_{30}FNO_{4}
Molar mass	391.483 g·mol^{−1}
- Except where otherwise noted, data are given for materials in their standard state (at 25 °C [77 °F], 100 kPa). Infobox references

Flusoxolol is a selective beta-1 receptor blocker.
