= Phthalimidopropiophenone =

Names
- IUPAC name 2-(1-oxo-1-phenylpropan-2-yl)isoindole-1,3-dione

Identifiers
CAS Number	19437-20-8
3D model (JSmol)	Interactive image
ChemSpider	453286
ECHA InfoCard	100.199.129
PubChem CID	519663
UNII	A7U6W3UB2N
CompTox Dashboard (EPA)	DTXSID70334107
- InChI: InChI=1S/C17H13NO3/c1-11(15(19)12-7-3-2-4-8-12)18-16(20)13-9-5-6-10-14(13)17(18)21/h2-11H,1H3 Key: CKLKGWHINGNHOK-UHFFFAOYSA-N
- SMILES: CC(C(=O)c1ccccc1)N2C(=O)c3ccccc3C2=O

Properties
Chemical formula	C_{17}H_{13}NO_{3}
Molar mass	279.295 g·mol^{−1}
Density	1.304 g/cm^{3}
Melting point	87 to 88 °C (189 to 190 °F; 360 to 361 K)
Boiling point	447.2 °C (837.0 °F; 720.3 K)

Hazards
Flash point	204.4 °C (399.9 °F; 477.5 K)
- Except where otherwise noted, data are given for materials in their standard state (at 25 °C [77 °F], 100 kPa). Infobox references

Phthalimidopropiophenone is a chemical intermediate used in the synthesis of cathinone. It has been found to be sold on the illicit market as a controlled substance analogue, but little is currently known about its pharmacology or toxicology.

Phthalimidopropiophenone is not an active stimulant, but is believed to be potentially capable of acting as a prodrug for cathinone when ingested, as similar N-substituted cathinone derivatives have been encountered by law enforcement, and were found to form cathinone in vivo by initial hydroxylation of the pyrrolidine ring followed by subsequent dehydrogenation to the corresponding lactam, then by double dealkylation of the pyrrolidine ring to form the primary amine. It is unclear how rapidly or to what extent this metabolic pathway is followed in humans however, and the phthalimido substituted cathinones encountered may have been produced merely as a more stable form for storage than the relatively unstable primary amine cathinone derivatives.
