= Bazinaprine =

Chemical compound

Clinical data
- ATC code: None

Identifiers
- IUPAC name: 3-{[2-(morpholin-4-yl)ethyl]amino}-6-phenylpyridazine-4-carbonitrile
- CAS Number: 94011-82-2
- PubChem CID: 72119
- ChemSpider: 65096
- UNII: NU8Y4C529J
- ChEMBL: ChEMBL150365
- CompTox Dashboard (EPA): DTXSID70240219

Chemical and physical data
- Formula: C_{17}H_{19}N_{5}O
- Molar mass: 309.373 g·mol^{−1}
- 3D model (JSmol): Interactive image
- SMILES: N#Cc2cc(nnc2NCCN1CCOCC1)c3ccccc3
- InChI: InChI=1S/C17H19N5O/c18-13-15-12-16(14-4-2-1-3-5-14)20-21-17(15)19-6-7-22-8-10-23-11-9-22/h1-5,12H,6-11H2,(H,19,21); Key:KRNDIPHOJLIHRI-UHFFFAOYSA-N

Bazinaprine (SR-95,191) is an experimental drug candidate. It is a monoamine oxidase inhibitor (MAOI) which is believed to be useful for the treatment of depression. The drug strongly inhibits type A monoamine oxidase, but only weakly inhibits type B. The effects of the drug are reversible in vivo, but not in vitro. In studies, the chemical has been shown to not interact in vivo with other neurotransmitter or drug receptor sites.

== See also ==
- Reversible inhibitor of MAO-A (RIMA)
