= Amfepentorex =

Anorectic stimulant drug

Amfepentorex INN: Amfepentorex

Clinical data
- ATC code: none

Identifiers
- IUPAC name: (±)-N-methyl-1-(4-pentylphenyl)propan-2-amine
- CAS Number: 15686-27-8
- PubChem CID: 71877
- ChemSpider: 64893
- UNII: OPE7BD4AAA
- ChEMBL: ChEMBL2104063
- CompTox Dashboard (EPA): DTXSID10864615

Chemical and physical data
- Formula: C_{15}H_{25}N
- Molar mass: 219.372 g·mol^{−1}
- 3D model (JSmol): Interactive image
- SMILES: N(C(Cc1ccc(cc1)CCCCC)C)C
- InChI: InChI=1S/C15H25N/c1-4-5-6-7-14-8-10-15(11-9-14)12-13(2)16-3/h8-11,13,16H,4-7,12H2,1-3H3; Key:XWNBHORZFYYYIJ-UHFFFAOYSA-N

Amfepentorex (INN) also known as CB-2201 is a stimulant drug derived from methamphetamine which was used as an appetite suppressant for the treatment of obesity, mainly in France in the 1970s. Dosage is 50–100 mg per day. Side effects include insomnia, hypertension and acute glaucoma.
