= Cirazoline =

Names
- Preferred IUPAC name 2-[(2-Cyclopropylphenoxy)methyl]-4,5-dihydro-1H-imidazole

Identifiers
CAS Number	59939-16-1
3D model (JSmol)	Interactive image
ChEMBL	ChEMBL13852
ChemSpider	2663
IUPHAR/BPS	515
MeSH	Cirazoline
PubChem CID	2765
UNII	QK318GVY3Y
CompTox Dashboard (EPA)	DTXSID4045131
- InChI: InChI=1S/C13H16N2O/c1-2-4-12(11(3-1)10-5-6-10)16-9-13-14-7-8-15-13/h1-4,10H,5-9H2,(H,14,15) Key: YAORIDZYZDUZCM-UHFFFAOYSA-N; InChI=1/C13H16N2O/c1-2-4-12(11(3-1)10-5-6-10)16-9-13-14-7-8-15-13/h1-4,10H,5-9H2,(H,14,15) Key: YAORIDZYZDUZCM-UHFFFAOYAV
- SMILES: O(c1c(cccc1)C2CC2)CC/3=N/CCN\3

Properties
Chemical formula	C_{13}H_{16}N_{2}O
Molar mass	216.284 g·mol^{−1}
- Except where otherwise noted, data are given for materials in their standard state (at 25 °C [77 °F], 100 kPa). verify (what is ?) Infobox references

Cirazoline is a full agonist at the α_{1A} adrenergic receptor, a partial agonist at both the α_{1B} and α_{1D} adrenergic receptors, and a nonselective antagonist to the α_{2} adrenergic receptor. It is believed that this combination of properties could make cirazoline an effective vasoconstricting agent.

Cirazoline has also been shown to decrease food intake in rats, purportedly through activation of α_{1} adrenoceptors in the paraventricular nucleus in the hypothalamus of the brain. Administration of cirazoline also seemed to present impairment in the spatial memory of monkeys through the activation of the same receptors that showed decreased food intake in rats. However, in preliminary studies, through stimulation of α_{2} adrenoceptors, working memory is comparatively improved.
