= Dopastin =

Names
- Preferred IUPAC name (2E)-N-{(2S)-2-[Hydroxy(nitroso)amino]-3-methylbutyl}but-2-enamide

Identifiers
CAS Number	37134-80-8
3D model (JSmol)	Interactive image
ChemSpider	4939169
PubChem CID	6434226
UNII	F8KR5E0EHC
CompTox Dashboard (EPA)	DTXSID001029849
- InChI: InChI=1S/C9H17N3O3/c1-4-5-9(13)10-6-8(7(2)3)12(15)11-14/h4-5,7-8,15H,6H2,1-3H3,(H,10,13)/b5-4+/t8-/m1/s1 Key: FJUBKTNNXRFHFD-WTSVBCDHSA-N; InChI=1/C9H17N3O3/c1-4-5-9(13)10-6-8(7(2)3)12(15)11-14/h4-5,7-8,15H,6H2,1-3H3,(H,10,13)/b5-4+/t8-/m1/s1 Key: FJUBKTNNXRFHFD-WTSVBCDHBR
- SMILES: O=C(NC[C@@H](N(O)N=O)C(C)C)/C=C/C

Properties
Chemical formula	C_{9}H_{17}N_{3}O_{3}
Molar mass	215.253 g·mol^{−1}
Melting point	116 to 119 °C (241 to 246 °F; 389 to 392 K)
Acidity (pK_{a})	5.1
- Except where otherwise noted, data are given for materials in their standard state (at 25 °C [77 °F], 100 kPa). Infobox references

Dopastin is a chemical compound produced by the bacteria Pseudomonas No. BAC-125. It was first isolated and characterized in 1972. It is an inhibitor of the enzyme dopamine β-hydroxylase.

Dopastin can be prepared synthetically from L-valinol.
