= Clofenciclan =

Chemical compound

Clinical data
- Trade names: Tonquil, Vesitan
- Other names: Chlorphencyclan
- Routes of administration: Oral
- ATC code: none

Identifiers
- IUPAC name: 2-[1-(4-chlorophenyl)cyclohexyl]oxy-N,N-diethylethanamine
- CAS Number: 5632-52-0
- PubChem CID: 25904
- ChemSpider: 24135
- UNII: P4BVX0D2MX
- ChEMBL: ChEMBL2106084
- CompTox Dashboard (EPA): DTXSID60204865

Chemical and physical data
- Formula: C_{18}H_{28}ClNO
- Molar mass: 309.88 g·mol^{−1}
- 3D model (JSmol): Interactive image
- SMILES: ClC1=CC=C(C2(CCCCC2)OCCN(CC)CC)C=C1
- InChI: InChI=1S/C18H28ClNO/c1-3-20(4-2)14-15-21-18(12-6-5-7-13-18)16-8-10-17(19)11-9-16/h8-11H,3-7,12-15H2,1-2H3; Key:FFCARBNHUSWRGK-UHFFFAOYSA-N

Clofenciclan (also known as chlorphencyclan; trade names Tonquil and Vesitan) is a dopamine-releasing agent developed by Boehringer & Soehne in the 1950s. It proved unpopular as a treatment because of its pronounced stimulant activity.

Sila analogues of clorphencyclane were developed.

== See also ==
- Arylcyclohexylamine
