= Arotinolol =

Chemical compound

Clinical data
- Trade names: Almarl
- Other names: S-596
- AHFS/Drugs.com: International Drug Names
- Routes of administration: Oral (tablets)
- ATC code: none

Legal status
- Legal status: In general: ℞ (Prescription only)

Pharmacokinetic data
- Bioavailability: 2 hours
- Elimination half-life: 10 hours

Identifiers
- IUPAC name: (RS)-5-(2-{[3-(tert-butylamino)-2-hydroxypropyl]sulfanyl}- 1,3-thiazol-4-yl)thiophene-2-carboxamide
- CAS Number: 68377-92-4
- PubChem CID: 2239
- ChemSpider: 2152
- UNII: 394E3P3B99
- KEGG: D07465
- ChEMBL: ChEMBL93298
- CompTox Dashboard (EPA): DTXSID3022619

Chemical and physical data
- Formula: C_{15}H_{21}N_{3}O_{2}S_{3}
- Molar mass: 371.53 g·mol^{−1}
- 3D model (JSmol): Interactive image
- SMILES: CC(C)(C)NCC(CSC1=NC(=CS1)C2=CC=C(S2)C(=O)N)O
- InChI: InChI=1S/C15H21N3O2S3/c1-15(2,3)17-6-9(19)7-21-14-18-10(8-22-14)11-4-5-12(23-11)13(16)20/h4-5,8-9,17,19H,6-7H2,1-3H3,(H2,16,20); Key:BHIAIPWSVYSKJS-UHFFFAOYSA-N

Arotinolol (INN, marketed under the tradename Almarl) is a medication in the class of mixed alpha/beta blockers. It also acts as a β_{3} receptor agonist. A 1979 publication suggests arotinolol as having first been described in the scientific literature by Sumitomo Chemical as "β-adrenergic blocking, antiarrhythmic compound S-596".

== Medical uses ==
It is used in the treatment of high blood pressure and essential tremor. Recommended dosage is 10 to 30 mg per day.
