= Phenopicolinic acid =

Names
- Preferred IUPAC name 5-[(4-Hydroxyphenyl)methyl]pyridine-2-carboxylic acid

Identifiers
CAS Number	56153-30-1
3D model (JSmol)	Interactive image
ChemSpider	2306742
PubChem CID	3043792
UNII	BQT8GD5527
CompTox Dashboard (EPA)	DTXSID00204687
- InChI: InChI=1S/C13H11NO3/c15-11-4-1-9(2-5-11)7-10-3-6-12(13(16)17)14-8-10/h1-6,8,15H,7H2,(H,16,17) Key: SJBFZHNCSGBLEK-UHFFFAOYSA-N; InChI=1/C13H11NO3/c15-11-4-1-9(2-5-11)7-10-3-6-12(13(16)17)14-8-10/h1-6,8,15H,7H2,(H,16,17) Key: SJBFZHNCSGBLEK-UHFFFAOYAB
- SMILES: C1=CC(=CC=C1CC2=CN=C(C=C2)C(=O)O)O

Properties
Chemical formula	C_{13}H_{11}NO_{3}
Molar mass	229.235 g·mol^{−1}
- Except where otherwise noted, data are given for materials in their standard state (at 25 °C [77 °F], 100 kPa). Infobox references

Phenopicolinic acid is a dopamine beta hydroxylase inhibitor.
