= Befol =

Befol may refer to:

- Befol, a brand name pharmaceutical product containing diclofenac and pridinol
- Befol, a synonym for the antidepressant eprobemide
