= Talinolol =

- Chemical structure of talinolol

Names
- IUPAC name (RS)-1-[4-[3-(tert-Butylamino)-2-hydroxypropoxy]phenyl]-3-cyclohexylurea

Identifiers
CAS Number	57460-41-0
3D model (JSmol)	Interactive image
ChEMBL	ChEMBL152067
ChemSpider	62014
ECHA InfoCard	100.228.618
IUPHAR/BPS	4664
PubChem CID	68770
UNII	3S82268BKG
CompTox Dashboard (EPA)	DTXSID6046426
- InChI: InChI=1S/C20H33N3O3/c1-20(2,3)21-13-17(24)14-26-18-11-9-16(10-12-18)23-19(25)22-15-7-5-4-6-8-15/h9-12,15,17,21,24H,4-8,13-14H2,1-3H3,(H2,22,23,25) Key: MXFWWQICDIZSOA-UHFFFAOYSA-N; InChI=1/C20H33N3O3/c1-20(2,3)21-13-17(24)14-26-18-11-9-16(10-12-18)23-19(25)22-15-7-5-4-6-8-15/h9-12,15,17,21,24H,4-8,13-14H2,1-3H3,(H2,22,23,25) Key: MXFWWQICDIZSOA-UHFFFAOYAN
- SMILES: CC(C)(C)NCC(COC1=CC=C(C=C1)NC(=O)NC2CCCCC2)O

Properties
Chemical formula	C_{20}H_{33}N_{3}O_{3}
Molar mass	363.502 g·mol^{−1}

Pharmacology
ATC code	C07AB13 (WHO)
- Except where otherwise noted, data are given for materials in their standard state (at 25 °C [77 °F], 100 kPa). verify (what is ?) Infobox references

Talinolol is a beta blocker.

== Stereochemistry ==
Talinolol contains a stereocenter and consists of two enantiomers. This is a racemate, i.e. a 1: 1 mixture of (R)- and the (S)-forms:

Enantiomers of talinolol
(R)-talinolol; CAS number: 71369-60-3	(S)-talinolol; CAS number: 71369-59-0
