= CX157 =

Chemical compound

Clinical data
- Routes of administration: Oral
- ATC code: none

Legal status
- Legal status: In general: uncontrolled

Identifiers
- IUPAC name: 3-fluoro-7-(2,2,2-trifluoroethoxy)phenoxathiine 10,10-dioxide
- CAS Number: 205187-53-7
- PubChem CID: 18687754
- ChemSpider: 13701383
- UNII: O6L62LZJ0Q
- CompTox Dashboard (EPA): DTXSID40174517

Chemical and physical data
- Formula: C_{14}H_{8}F_{4}O_{4}S
- Molar mass: 348.27 g·mol^{−1}
- 3D model (JSmol): Interactive image
- SMILES: FC(F)(F)COc2cc3Oc1cc(F)ccc1S(=O)(=O)c3cc2
- InChI: InChI=1S/C14H8F4O4S/c15-8-1-3-12-10(5-8)22-11-6-9(21-7-14(16,17)18)2-4-13(11)23(12,19)20/h1-6H,7H2; Key:PDIMOTRDGUQMNY-UHFFFAOYSA-N

CX157 (proposed trade name TriRima, formerly Tyrima) is a selective and reversible inhibitor of MAO-A (RIMA). As of 2007 it was in phase II clinical trials for the treatment of depression. In 2013, work on the drug was terminated.
