= Esuprone =

Names
- Preferred IUPAC name 3,4-Dimethyl-2-oxo-2H-1-benzopyran-7-yl ethanesulfonate

Identifiers
CAS Number	91406-11-0
3D model (JSmol)	Interactive image
ChEMBL	ChEMBL18504
ChemSpider	59239
PubChem CID	65827
UNII	K7EB9E48ZE
CompTox Dashboard (EPA)	DTXSID60238549
- InChI: InChI=1S/C13H14O5S/c1-4-19(15,16)18-10-5-6-11-8(2)9(3)13(14)17-12(11)7-10/h5-7H,4H2,1-3H3 Key: CHDGAVDQRSPBTA-UHFFFAOYSA-N; InChI=1/C13H14O5S/c1-4-19(15,16)18-10-5-6-11-8(2)9(3)13(14)17-12(11)7-10/h5-7H,4H2,1-3H3 Key: CHDGAVDQRSPBTA-UHFFFAOYAR
- SMILES: O=S(=O)(Oc2ccc\1c(OC(=O)/C(=C/1C)C)c2)CC

Properties
Chemical formula	C_{13}H_{14}O_{5}S
Molar mass	282.31 g·mol^{−1}
- Except where otherwise noted, data are given for materials in their standard state (at 25 °C [77 °F], 100 kPa). verify (what is ?) Infobox references

Esuprone is an experimental drug candidate being investigated as an antidepressant. It acts as a monoamine oxidase A (MAO-A) inhibitor.
