= Methoxyphenylpiperazine =

Methoxyphenylpiperazine may refer to:

- ortho-Methoxyphenylpiperazine (2-Methoxyphenylpiperazine)
- para-Methoxyphenylpiperazine (4-Methoxyphenylpiperazine)
