= Eugenodilol =

Chemical compound

Clinical data
- ATC code: None

Identifiers
- IUPAC name: 1-(4-Allyl-2-methoxyphenoxy)-3-{[2-(2-methoxyphenoxy)ethyl]amino}-2-propanol
- CAS Number: 242796-68-5
- PubChem CID: 9930145
- ChemSpider: 8105776
- CompTox Dashboard (EPA): DTXSID801031595

Chemical and physical data
- Formula: C_{22}H_{29}NO_{5}
- Molar mass: 387.476 g·mol^{−1}
- 3D model (JSmol): Interactive image
- SMILES: O(c1ccc(cc1OC)C\C=C)CC(O)CNCCOc2ccccc2OC
- InChI: InChI=1S/C22H29NO5/c1-4-7-17-10-11-21(22(14-17)26-3)28-16-18(24)15-23-12-13-27-20-9-6-5-8-19(20)25-2/h4-6,8-11,14,18,23-24H,1,7,12-13,15-16H2,2-3H3; Key:NWFVEPJYORHHOG-UHFFFAOYSA-N

Eugenodilol is an alpha-1 blocker and beta blocker with weak β_{2}-adrenergic receptor agonist activity derived from eugenol.
