= Neldazosin =

Names
- IUPAC name 1-[4-(4-Amino-6,7-dimethoxyquinazolin-2-yl)piperazin-1-yl]-3-hydroxybutan-1-one

Identifiers
CAS Number	109713-79-3
3D model (JSmol)	Interactive image
ChemSpider	59317
PubChem CID	65908
UNII	G3E7RO42MB
CompTox Dashboard (EPA)	DTXSID40869512
- InChI: InChI=1S/C18H25N5O4/c1-11(24)8-16(25)22-4-6-23(7-5-22)18-20-13-10-15(27-3)14(26-2)9-12(13)17(19)21-18/h9-11,24H,4-8H2,1-3H3,(H2,19,20,21) Key: IOSMPEJNAQZKJT-UHFFFAOYSA-N
- SMILES: CC(CC(=O)N1CCN(CC1)C2=NC3=CC(=C(C=C3C(=N2)N)OC)OC)O

Properties
Chemical formula	C_{18}H_{25}N_{5}O_{4}
Molar mass	375.429 g·mol^{−1}
- Except where otherwise noted, data are given for materials in their standard state (at 25 °C [77 °F], 100 kPa). Infobox references

Neldazosin is an α-adrenoreceptor antagonist.
