= Hexacyclonate =

Chemical compound

Identifiers
- IUPAC name: [1-(hydroxymethyl)cyclohexyl]acetic acid
- CAS Number: 7491-42-1
- PubChem CID: 23444
- ChemSpider: 21921
- UNII: 2K0FP9UB6A
- ChEMBL: ChEMBL2110826
- CompTox Dashboard (EPA): DTXSID30225885 DTXSID60220363, DTXSID30225885

Chemical and physical data
- Formula: C_{9}H_{16}O_{3}
- Molar mass: 172.224 g·mol^{−1}
- 3D model (JSmol): Interactive image
- SMILES: O=C(O)CC1(CO)CCCCC1
- InChI: InChI=1S/C9H16O3/c10-7-9(6-8(11)12)4-2-1-3-5-9/h10H,1-7H2,(H,11,12); Key:WMJPAYUKEVEBCN-UHFFFAOYSA-N

Hexacyclonate (Gevilon) is a stimulant drug. It has been used for the treatment of alcoholism and for increasing motivation in elderly patients, but Gevilon (containing a different active substance - gemfibrozil) is now mainly used for the treatment of hyperlipoproteinaemia. It is chemically similar to the anticonvulsant gabapentin, with a hydroxyl group replacing the amine.

The latter use may be incorrectly assigned, as "Gevilon" has been used as a trade name for gemfibrozil, a well-known drug for dislipidemia.

== Synthesis ==

The treatment of 1,1-Cyclohexanediacetic acid [4355-11-7] (1) with acetic anhydride led to Cyclohexanediacetic anhydride [1010-26-0] (2). Esterification with methanol led to 1,1-Cyclohexanediacetic acid mono methyl ester [60142-94-1] (3). Treatment of the monoacid with potassium hydroxide gave the alkoxide (4). Treatment with bromine in the presence of tetrachloromethane gave Methyl 3,3-pentamethylene-4-bromobutyrate (5). Reaction with aqueous lye gave 2-Oxaspiro[4.5]decan-3-one (GO 177) [7236-78-4] (6). Further treatment with aqueous lye completed the synthesis of hexacyclonate (7).
