= Sercloremine =

Names
- Preferred IUPAC name 4-(5-Chloro-1-benzofuran-2-yl)-1-methylpiperidine

Identifiers
CAS Number	54403-19-9
3D model (JSmol)	Interactive image
ChemSpider	142884
PubChem CID	162749
UNII	8H340QZ35T
CompTox Dashboard (EPA)	DTXSID601029766
- InChI: InChI=1S/C14H16ClNO/c1-16-6-4-10(5-7-16)14-9-11-8-12(15)2-3-13(11)17-14/h2-3,8-10H,4-7H2,1H3 Key: FTKTZRKAVSDSRA-UHFFFAOYSA-N
- SMILES: CN1CCC(CC1)C2=CC3=C(O2)C=CC(=C3)Cl

Properties
Chemical formula	C_{14}H_{16}ClNO
Molar mass	249.74 g·mol^{−1}
- Except where otherwise noted, data are given for materials in their standard state (at 25 °C [77 °F], 100 kPa). Infobox references

Sercloremine (CGP-4718A), usually as the hydrochloride salt, is a drug which was developed in the 1980s and was formerly under investigation as an antidepressant, but was never marketed. It acts as a selective, reversible inhibitor of monoamine oxidase A (RIMA) and serotonin reuptake inhibitor.
