= Oudenone =

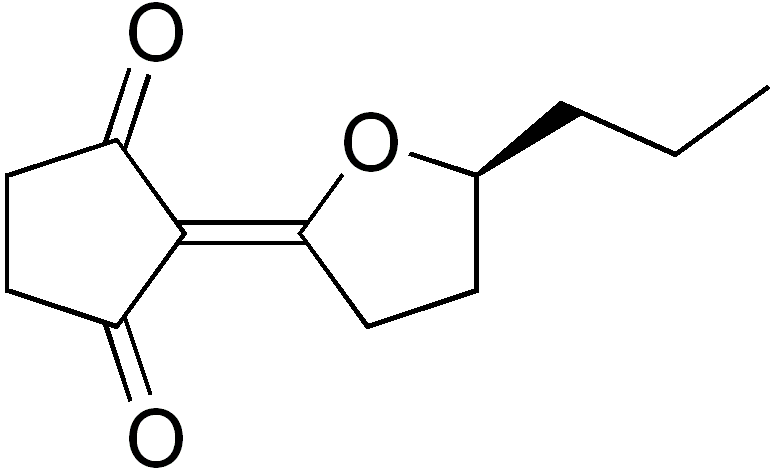

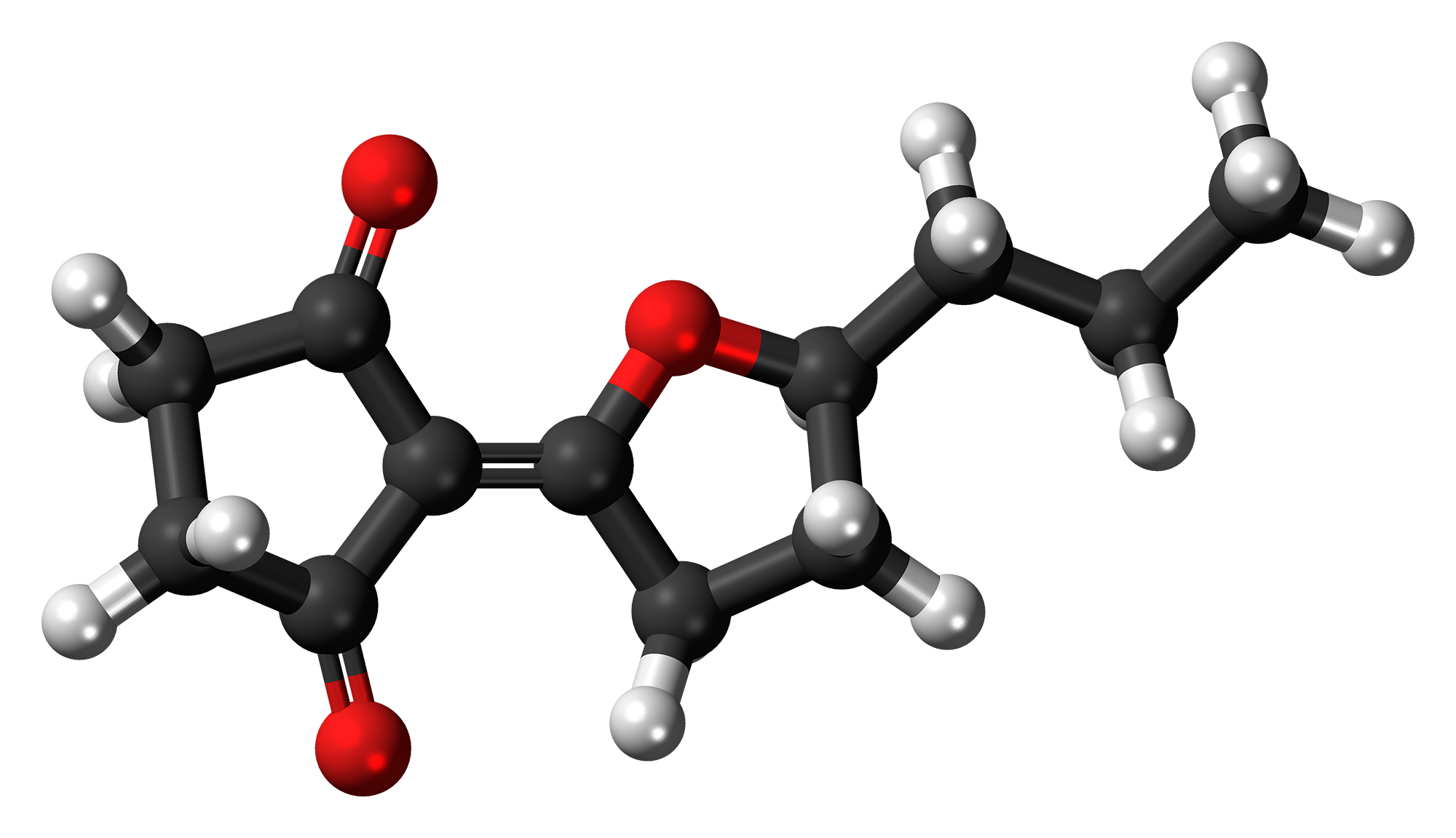

Names
- Preferred IUPAC name 2-[(5S)-5-Propyloxolan-2-ylidene]cyclopentane-1,3-dione

Identifiers
CAS Number	31323-50-9
3D model (JSmol)	Interactive image
ChemSpider	140806
PubChem CID	160199
UNII	2X2W3L9A37
CompTox Dashboard (EPA)	DTXSID70185252
- InChI: InChI=1S/C12H16O3/c1-2-3-8-4-7-11(15-8)12-9(13)5-6-10(12)14/h8H,2-7H2,1H3/t8-/m0/s1 Key: AFHDYMGMZUYZQT-QMMMGPOBSA-N; InChI=1/C12H16O3/c1-2-3-8-4-7-11(15-8)12-9(13)5-6-10(12)14/h8H,2-7H2,1H3/t8-/m0/s1 Key: AFHDYMGMZUYZQT-QMMMGPOBBE
- SMILES: O=C1C(/C(=O)CC1)=C2/O[C@H](CC2)CCC

Properties
Chemical formula	C_{12}H_{16}O_{3}
Molar mass	208.25 g/mol
- Except where otherwise noted, data are given for materials in their standard state (at 25 °C [77 °F], 100 kPa). verify (what is ?) Infobox references

Oudenone is a molecule found in fungus metabolism. It is an inhibitor of the enzyme tyrosine hydroxylase.
