= Befloxatone =

Names
- Preferred IUPAC name (5R)-5-(Methoxymethyl)-3-{4-[(3R)-4,4,4-trifluoro-3-hydroxybutoxy]phenyl}-1,3-oxazolidin-2-one

Identifiers
CAS Number	134564-82-2
3D model (JSmol)	Interactive image
ChEMBL	ChEMBL416578
ChemSpider	54811
IUPHAR/BPS	6637
KEGG	D02563
PubChem CID	60824
UNII	4H75PAD8M3
CompTox Dashboard (EPA)	DTXSID70158800
- InChI: InChI=1S/C15H18F3NO5/c1-22-9-12-8-19(14(21)24-12)10-2-4-11(5-3-10)23-7-6-13(20)15(16,17)18/h2-5,12-13,20H,6-9H2,1H3/t12-,13-/m1/s1 Key: IALVDLPLCLFBCF-CHWSQXEVSA-N; InChI=1/C15H18F3NO5/c1-22-9-12-8-19(14(21)24-12)10-2-4-11(5-3-10)23-7-6-13(20)15(16,17)18/h2-5,12-13,20H,6-9H2,1H3/t12-,13-/m1/s1 Key: IALVDLPLCLFBCF-CHWSQXEVBB
- SMILES: O=C2O[C@H](CN2c1ccc(OCC[C@@H](O)C(F)(F)F)cc1)COC

Properties
Chemical formula	C_{15}H_{18}F_{3}NO_{5}
Molar mass	349.30233
- Except where otherwise noted, data are given for materials in their standard state (at 25 °C [77 °F], 100 kPa). verify (what is ?) Infobox references

Befloxatone (MD-370,503) is a reversible inhibitor of monoamine oxidase A.
