= Cimoxatone =

Chemical compound

Clinical data
- ATC code: none

Identifiers
- IUPAC name: 3-[[4-[5-(methoxymethyl)-2-oxo-oxazolidin-3-yl]phenoxy]methyl]benzonitrile
- CAS Number: 73815-11-9
- PubChem CID: 52542
- ChemSpider: 47493
- UNII: V6FT1QJ7VL
- KEGG: D02581
- ChEMBL: ChEMBL2104092
- CompTox Dashboard (EPA): DTXSID50868273
- ECHA InfoCard: 100.070.537

Chemical and physical data
- Formula: C_{19}H_{18}N_{2}O_{4}
- Molar mass: 338.363 g·mol^{−1}
- InChI: InChI=1S/C19H18N2O4/c1-23-13-18-11-21(19(22)25-18)16-5-7-17(8-6-16)24-12-15-4-2-3-14(9-15)10-20/h2-9,18H,11-13H2,1H3; Key:MVVJINIUPYKZHR-UHFFFAOYSA-N

Cimoxatone (MD 780515) is a reversible inhibitor of MAO-A (RIMA). It was never marketed.

Cimoxatone has a half-life of 12.4 hours in humans.

== See also ==
- Monoamine oxidase inhibitor
