= Alpha-1 adrenergic receptor =

G protein-coupled receptor

The alpha-1 (α_{1}) adrenergic receptor (or adrenoceptor) is a G protein-coupled receptor (GPCR) associated with the G_{q} heterotrimeric G protein. It consists of three highly homologous subtypes, α_{1A}-, α_{1B}-, and α_{1D}-adrenergic. There is no α_{1C} receptor. At one time, there was a subtype known as α_{1C}, but it was found to be identical to the previously discovered α_{1A} receptor subtype. To avoid confusion, naming was continued with the letter D. Catecholamines like norepinephrine (noradrenaline) and epinephrine (adrenaline) signal through the α_{1}-adrenergic receptors in the central and peripheral nervous systems. The crystal structure of the α_{1B}-adrenergic receptor subtype has been determined in complex with the inverse agonist (+)-cyclazosin.

== Effects ==
The α_{1}-adrenergic receptor has several general functions in common with the α_{2}-adrenergic receptor, but also has specific effects of its own. α_{1}-receptors primarily mediate smooth muscle contraction, but have important functions elsewhere as well. The neurotransmitter norepinephrine has higher affinity for the α_{1} receptor than does the hormone epinephrine.

=== Smooth muscle ===
In smooth muscle cells of blood vessels the principal effect of activation of these receptors is vasoconstriction. Blood vessels with α_{1}-adrenergic receptors are present in the skin, the sphincters of gastrointestinal system, kidney (renal artery) and brain. During the fight-or-flight response vasoconstriction results in decreased blood flow to these organs. This accounts for the pale appearance of the skin of an individual when frightened.

It also induces contraction of the internal urethral sphincter of the urinary bladder, although this effect is minor compared to the relaxing effect of β_{2}-adrenergic receptors. In other words, the overall effect of sympathetic stimuli on the bladder is relaxation, in order to inhibit micturition upon anticipation of a stressful event. Other effects on smooth muscle are contraction in:

- Ureter
- Uterus (when pregnant): this is minor compared to the relaxing effects of the β_{2} receptor, agonists of which—notably albuterol/salbutamol—were formerly used to inhibit premature labor.
- Urethral sphincter
- Bronchioles (although minor to the relaxing effect of β_{2} receptor on bronchioles)
- Iris dilator muscle
- Seminal tract, resulting in ejaculation

=== Neuronal ===
Activation of α_{1}-adrenergic receptors produces anorexia and partially mediates the efficacy of appetite suppressants like phenylpropanolamine and amphetamine in the treatment of obesity. Norepinephrine has been shown to decrease cellular excitability in all layers of the temporal cortex, including the primary auditory cortex. In particular, norepinephrine decreases glutamatergic excitatory postsynaptic potentials by the activation of α_{1}-adrenergic receptors. Norepinephrine also stimulates serotonin release by binding α_{1}-adrenergic receptors located on serotonergic neurons in the raphe. α_{1}-adrenergic receptor subtypes increase inhibition in the olfactory system, suggesting a synaptic mechanism for noradrenergic modulation of olfactory driven behaviors.

=== Other ===
- Both positive and negative inotropic effects on heart muscle
- Secretion from salivary gland
- Increase salivary potassium levels
- Glycogenolysis and gluconeogenesis in liver.
- Secretion from sweat glands
- Contraction of the urinary bladder urothelium and lamina propria
- Na^{+} reabsorption from kidney
  - Stimulate proximal tubule NHE3
  - Stimulate proximal tubule basolateral Na-K ATPase
- Activate mitogenic responses and regulate growth and proliferation of many cells
- Involved in the detection of mechanical feedback on the hypoglossal motor neurons which allow a long-term facilitation in respiration in response to repeated apneas.

== Signaling cascade ==
α_{1}-Adrenergic receptors are members of the G protein-coupled receptor superfamily. Upon activation, a heterotrimeric G protein, G_{q}, activates phospholipase C (PLC), which causes phosphatidylinositol to be transformed into inositol trisphosphate (IP_{3}) and diacylglycerol (DAG). While DAG stays near the membrane, IP_{3} diffuses into the cytosol and to find the IP_{3} receptor on the endoplasmic reticulum, triggering calcium release from the stores. This triggers further effects, primarily through the activation of an enzyme Protein Kinase C. This enzyme, as a kinase, functions by phosphorylation of other enzymes causing their activation, or by phosphorylation of certain channels leading to the increase or decrease of electrolyte transfer in or out of the cell.

== Activity during exercise ==
During exercise, α_{1}-adrenergic receptors in active muscles are attenuated in an exercise intensity-dependent manner, allowing the β_{2}-adrenergic receptors which mediate vasodilation to dominate. In contrast to α_{2}-adrenergic receptors, α_{1}-adrenergic-receptors in the arterial vasculature of skeletal muscle are more resistant to inhibition, and attenuation of α1-adrenergic-receptor-mediated vasoconstriction only occurs during heavy exercise.

Note that only active muscle α_{1}-adrenergic receptors will be blocked. Resting muscle will not have its α_{1}-adrenergic receptors blocked, and hence the overall effect will be α_{1}-adrenergic-mediated vasoconstriction.

== Ligands ==
Agonists

- Cirazoline (vasoconstrictor)
- Methoxamine (vasoconstrictor)
- Synephrine (mild vasoconstrictor)
- Etilefrine (antihypotensive)
- Metaraminol (antihypotensive)
- Midodrine (antihypotensive)
- Naphazoline (decongestant)
- Norepinephrine (vasoconstrictor)
- Oxymetazoline (decongestant)
- Phenylephrine (decongestant)
- Pseudoephedrine (decongestant)
- Tetrahydrozoline (decongestant)
- Xylometazoline (decongestant)
- Sdz-nvi-085 [104195-17-7].

Antagonists

- Acepromazine (antipsychotic, secondary mechanism)
- Alfuzosin (used in benign prostatic hyperplasia)
- Arotinolol
- Carvedilol (used in congestive heart failure; it is a non-selective beta blocker)
- Chlorpromazine (antipsychotic and powerful antihypertensive)
- Doxazosin (used in hypertension and benign prostatic hyperplasia)
- Indoramin
- Labetalol (used in hypertension; it is a mixed alpha/beta adrenergic antagonist)
- Moxisylyte
- Phenoxybenzamine
- Phentolamine (used in hypertensive emergencies; it is a nonselective alpha-antagonist)
- Prazosin (used in hypertension)
- Quetiapine
- Risperidone
- Silodosin
- Tamsulosin (used in benign prostatic hyperplasia)
- Terazosin
- Tiamenidine
- Tolazoline
- Trazodone
- Trimazosin
- Urapidil

Various heterocyclic antidepressants and antipsychotics are α_{1}-adrenergic receptor antagonists as well. This action is generally undesirable in such agents and mediates side effects like orthostatic hypotension, and headaches due to excessive vasodilation.

== See also ==
- Adrenergic receptor
- Sympathetic nervous system
