= Adriane Fugh-Berman =

American medical researcher

- Education: American University; University of the District of Columbia; Georgetown University School of Medicine
- Occupation: Physician

Adriane Fugh-Berman is a professor in the department of pharmacology and physiology, and in the department of family medicine, at Georgetown University Medical Center. She is also the director of PharmedOut, a Georgetown University Medical Center project that promotes rational prescribing and researches the effects of pharmaceutical and medical device industry marketing on prescribing behavior and therapeutic choices. Additionally, she is the co-director of the M.S. in Health and the Public Interest Program at the Georgetown University Graduate School of Arts & Sciences. She has compiled peer-reviewed articles in the category of industry influence on medicine. These articles include the first medical literature studies on the topic of how the pharmaceutical practices influence surgeons, scientists, pharmacists, and patients.

== Education ==
Fugh-Berman graduated from American University with a B.A. in Literature and Environmental Studies and received a B.S. from the University of the District of Columbia. She received her M.D. from Georgetown University School of Medicine, after which she completed an internship in family medicine at Montefiore Medical Center.

== Career ==
Prior to joining Georgetown, Fugh-Berman worked as a medical officer at the National Institute for Child Health and Human Development, and with the Reproductive Toxicology Center. Fugh-Berman appeared on Netflix documentary "The Bleeding Edge", which highlights the dangers for patients of rushed technological changes in the medical devices field. A clip of her was featured on John Oliver's "Medical Devices" episode on HBO. Dr. Fugh-Berman is a professor at Georgetown University School of Medicine, where she also leads the PharmedOUT program.

Dr. Fugh-Berman is a paid expert witness on behalf of plaintiffs in litigation regarding pharmaceutical and medical device marketing practices.. She is also an author of medical literacy | https://gufaculty360.georgetown.edu/s/contact/00336000014RYRnAAO/adriane-fughberman-md .

== Research ==
Fugh-Berman has published numerous studies regarding the relationship between physicians and the pharmaceutical industry, off-label promotion, ghostwritten articles, and invented diseases.

Dr. Fugh-Berman collaborates with Dr. Susan Wood at the George Washington University Milken Institute School of Public Health and the Washington DC Department of Health on the DC Center for Rational Prescribing, which provides free, industry-free continuing medical education and resources to physicians, physician assistants, nurses, and pharmacists.

Dr. Fugh-Berman is also an expert on botanical medicine and dietary supplements and directs Georgetown's Urban Herbs project, which maintains ecological gardens on campus that intermix edible, medicinal, and ornamental plants. She is the author of a clinical textbook, The 5-Minute Herb and Dietary Supplement Consult.

Dr. Fugh-Berman had a career as a medical officer in the Contraception and Reproductive Health Branch at the National Institute for Child Health and Human Development. She also worked at the Reproductive Toxicology Center, a non-profit, and played a role in editing an award-winning newsletter emphasized on Women's Health Education.

=== Opioid crisis ===
Georgetown University Medical Center professor, Fugh-Berman, served as a paid expert witness in the lawsuit filed in 2017 by the State of Oklahoma against 13 major pharmaceutical companies for "damages linked to the opioid crisis. According to the original 2017 petition, Oklahoma said the sale of Oxycontin, by its manufacturer, Purdue Pharma, from 1996 to 2009, rose from $48 million to $3 billion. According to a March 26, 2019 PBS News article, Fugh-Berman who works out of the University's Department of Pharmacology and Physiology, said that over time, "industry-generated narrative [became] conventional wisdom". PBS News wrote that "these deadly consequences didn't happen overnight". Fugh-Berman said that the industry used "pervasive marketing tactics" to "influence conversations" between "patients", "doctors, medical school students and instructors". The article said that "One tactic that opioid manufacturers used to protect sales was the rebranding of substance use disorder as pseudo addiction — that patients who took opioid medication and later developed symptoms of addiction should be treated with more opioids. According to the PBS News March 2019 article, "while fewer doctors are writing opioid prescriptions" than they did prior to the mid-2010s, Fugh-Berman said that "it is nowhere near a reasonable level." PBS said that even in 2019, "opioid marketing continues to lead doctors to guide patients toward the drugs."

== Views ==
Fugh-Berman has been critical of multiple popular pharmaceutical drugs and treatments, including testosterone replacement therapy and flibanserin. She has also criticized how the numerical values used to diagnose diabetes and high cholesterol have been lowered over time, and has criticized Eli Lilly for allegedly inventing premenstrual dysphoric disorder to sell its drug Sarafem.

== Personal ==
Fugh-Berman's mother Aline Fugh Berman (Chinese: 傅曖泠) was the eldest sister of former U.S. Army Major General John Fugh, who was married to Connie Chung's elder sister June. Aline's younger sister, artist Dora Fugh Lee (Chinese: 傅鐸若), is the mother of Shanghai-based attorney and property developer Handel Lee.
