= ABT-670 =

Chemical compound

Identifiers
- IUPAC name: 3-methyl-N-(1-oxy-3',4',5',6'-tetrahydro-2'H-[2,4'-bipyridine]-1'-ylmethyl)benzamide
- CAS Number: 630119-43-6
- PubChem CID: 16094676
- ChemSpider: 17252978
- UNII: 4L6071XH2J
- ChEMBL: ChEMBL219182
- CompTox Dashboard (EPA): DTXSID30212235

Chemical and physical data
- Formula: C_{19}H_{23}N_{3}O_{2}
- Molar mass: 325.412 g·mol^{−1}
- 3D model (JSmol): Interactive image
- SMILES: [O-][n+]1ccccc1C(CC3)CCN3CNC(=O)c(c2)cccc2C
- InChI: InChI=1S/C19H23N3O2/c1-15-5-4-6-17(13-15)19(23)20-14-21-11-8-16(9-12-21)18-7-2-3-10-22(18)24/h2-7,10,13,16H,8-9,11-12,14H2,1H3,(H,20,23); Key:PUMMPCXNEPHBNN-UHFFFAOYSA-N

ABT-670 is a drug which acts as a potent, orally bioavailable dopamine agonist selective for the D_{4} subtype, which was developed as a possible treatment for erectile dysfunction, although its current uses are limited to scientific research.

== See also ==
- ABT-724
- Bremelanotide
- Cabergoline
- Flibanserin
- Intrinsa
- Melanotan II
- Pramipexole
- PF-219,061
- Tibolone
- UK-414,495
