= UK-414,495 =

Medication

Identifiers
- IUPAC name: (2R)-2-({1-[(5-ethyl-1,3,4-thiadiazol-2-yl)carbamoyl]cyclopentyl}methyl)pentanoic acid
- CAS Number: 337962-93-3
- PubChem CID: 9949799
- ChemSpider: 8125410
- UNII: JV29CG9MQ2
- ChEMBL: ChEMBL378763
- CompTox Dashboard (EPA): DTXSID10432050

Chemical and physical data
- Formula: C_{16}H_{25}N_{3}O_{3}S
- Molar mass: 339.45 g·mol^{−1}
- 3D model (JSmol): Interactive image
- SMILES: CCC[C@H](CC1(CCCC1)C(=O)NC2=NN=C(S2)CC)C(=O)O
- InChI: InChI=1S/C16H25N3O3S/c1-3-7-11(13(20)21)10-16(8-5-6-9-16)14(22)17-15-19-18-12(4-2)23-15/h11H,3-10H2,1-2H3,(H,20,21)(H,17,19,22)/t11-/m1/s1; Key:FWXXCSISWQQOGS-LLVKDONJSA-N

UK-414,495 is a drug developed by Pfizer for the treatment of female sexual arousal disorder. UK-414,495 acts as a potent, selective inhibitor of the enzyme neutral endopeptidase, which normally serves to break down the neuropeptide VIP. The consequent increase in VIP activity alters blood flow to the genital region leading to increased lubrication and muscle relaxation.

== See also ==
- List of investigational sexual dysfunction drugs
- ABT-670
- ABT-724
- Bremelanotide
- Cabergoline
- Flibanserin
- Testosterone (patch)
- Melanotan II
- Pramipexole
- PF-219,061
- S-17092
- Tibolone
