= PD-128,907 =

Chemical compound

Identifiers
- IUPAC name: (4aR,10bR)-3,4a,4,10b-Tetrahydro-4-propyl-2H,5H-[1]benzopyrano-[4,3-b]-1,4-oxazin-9-ol
- CAS Number: 123594-64-9 300576-59-4 (hydrochloride)
- PubChem CID: 5311346
- ChemSpider: 23180492
- ChEMBL: ChEMBL94015
- CompTox Dashboard (EPA): DTXSID301018037

Chemical and physical data
- Formula: C_{14}H_{19}NO_{3}
- Molar mass: 249.310 g·mol^{−1}
- 3D model (JSmol): Interactive image
- SMILES: CCCN1CCO[C@H]2[C@H]1COC3=C2C=C(C=C3)O
- InChI: InChI=1S/C14H19NO3/c1-2-5-15-9-17-7-12-11-6-10(16)3-4-14(11)18-8-13(12)15/h3-4,6,12-13,16H,2,5,7-9H2,1H3/t12-,13-/m1/s1; Key:ZFSOBPVEIKTNQS-CHWSQXEVSA-N

PD-128,907 is a drug used in scientific research which acts as a potent and selective agonist for the dopamine D_{2} and D_{3} receptors. It is used for studying the role of these receptors in the brain, in roles such as inhibitory autoreceptors that act to limit further dopamine release, as well as release of other neurotransmitters. In animal studies, it has been shown to reduce toxicity from cocaine overdose.

== See also ==
- 3-Aminochroman
- 7-OH-DPAT
- PF-219,061
- PF-592,379
