= ABT-724 =

Chemical compound

Identifiers
- IUPAC name: 2-(4-pyridin-2-ylpiperazin-1-ylmethyl)-1H-benzimidazole
- CAS Number: 70006-24-5
- PubChem CID: 5025739
- ChemSpider: 4204515
- UNII: 4WV2575JWT
- ChEMBL: ChEMBL440687
- CompTox Dashboard (EPA): DTXSID001025592

Chemical and physical data
- Formula: C_{17}H_{19}N_{5}
- Molar mass: 293.374 g·mol^{−1}
- 3D model (JSmol): Interactive image
- SMILES: n2c1ccccc1[nH]c2CN(CC4)CCN4c3ncccc3
- InChI: InChI=1S/C17H19N5/c1-2-6-15-14(5-1)19-16(20-15)13-21-9-11-22(12-10-21)17-7-3-4-8-18-17/h1-8H,9-13H2,(H,19,20); Key:FRPJGTNLZNXQEX-UHFFFAOYSA-N

ABT-724 is a drug which acts as a dopamine agonist, and is selective for the D_{4} subtype. It was developed as a possible drug for the treatment of erectile dysfunction, although poor oral bioavailability means alternative drugs such as ABT-670 may be more likely to be developed commercially. Nonetheless, it continues to be used in scientific research into the function of the D_{4} receptor.

== See also ==
- ABT-670
- Bremelanotide
- Cabergoline
- Flibanserin
- Intrinsa
- Melanotan II
- Pramipexole
- PF-219,061
- Tibolone
- UK-414,495
