= PharmedOut =

Georgetown University Medical Center project

- Abbreviation: PhO
- Formation: 2006
- Founded at: Georgetown University Medical Center
- Purpose: healthcare
- Key people: Adriane Fugh-Berman (Director)
- Website: www.pharmedout.org

PharmedOut (PhO) is a Georgetown University Medical Center project founded in 2006. It is directed by Adriane Fugh-Berman. The stated mission of the organization is to advance evidence-based prescribing and educate healthcare professionals about pharmaceutical marketing practices.

Three stated goals of the project are:

1. Document and disseminate information about how pharmaceutical companies influence prescribing

2. Foster access to unbiased information about drugs

3. Encourage physicians to choose pharma-free CME (continuing medical education).

This organization provides healthcare professionals with pharma-free continuing medical education (CME) and resources to unbiased drug information. PharmedOut was founded with funds from the Attorney General Consumer and Prescriber Education grant program. Since 2008, PharmedOut has been financially supported by individual donations and largely staffed by a volunteer team of physicians, pharmacists, nurses, scientists, lawyers, students, artists and writers.

PharmedOut criticizes some medical research and practices, including overprescription of opioids, industry construction of and influence on perceptions of diseases and symptoms, misleading information about the benefits of and harms of testosterone, menopausal hormone therapy, flibanserin, and Epipens.

Articles in peer-reviewed publications include an article about how Medicare prescribers who accept industry gifts prescribe more medications (and more expensive medications), one by Sunita Sah on how industry uses social psychology to manipulate physicians, pharmacist-industry relationships, an article on medical device salespeople and surgeons, an analysis of pharmaceutical marketing to people with hemophilia an analysis of how "key opinion leaders" are used to market drugs off-label, an explanation of drug rep tactics, an article on basic scientists and industry, and a study that documents the effect of Why Lunch Matters, a presentation that is the first to document a significant change in physicians' perceptions about their own individual vulnerability to pharmaceutical marketing.

PharmedOut has also criticized industry support of continuing medical education and industry support of patient advocacy groups, and has compiled a list of pharma-free patient advocacy groups.

In its first 10 years, PharmedOUT has published the first studies on "Relationships between surgeons and medical device representatives", "Pharmacists' beliefs regarding pharmaceutical companies", "How drug company representatives influence physicians", "Promotional Tone in industry-influenced articles", "How companies market drugs off-label", "How ghostwriting sold menopausal hormone therapy", "Reverse-engineering marketing messages in industry-funded CME", "The way pharma targets individuals with hemophilia and other expensive diseases", "The first national survey of family medicine resident interactions with pharmaceutical companies", and "The effects of our first educational module about industry tactics on physicians' perceptions of their own vulnerability to marketing".
