= PF-219,061 =

Chemical compound

Clinical data
- Routes of administration: Nasal

Legal status
- Legal status: Investigational (discontinued)

Identifiers
- IUPAC name: (R)-3-(4-propylmorpholin-2-yl)phenol
- CAS Number: 710654-74-3
- PubChem CID: 9794475
- ChemSpider: 7970242
- UNII: ZK5ZP8L5S2
- CompTox Dashboard (EPA): DTXSID90430791

Chemical and physical data
- Formula: C_{13}H_{19}NO_{2}
- Molar mass: 221.300 g·mol^{−1}
- 3D model (JSmol): Interactive image
- SMILES: CCCN1CCO[C@@H](C1)C2=CC(=CC=C2)O
- InChI: InChI=1S/C13H19NO2/c1-2-6-14-7-8-16-13(10-14)11-4-3-5-12(15)9-11/h3-5,9,13,15H,2,6-8,10H2,1H3/t13-/m0/s1; Key:WYEGTIGJSHGEID-ZDUSSCGKSA-N

PF-219,061 is a drug that was under development by Pfizer which acts as a potent and highly selective agonist for the dopamine D_{3} receptor. It was under development as a potential medication for the treatment of female sexual dysfunction. It did not advance into clinical trials.

== See also ==
- List of investigational sexual dysfunction drugs
- ABT-670
- ABT-724
- Cabergoline
- Bremelanotide
- Flibanserin
- Intrinsa
- Melanotan II
- OSU-6162
- PF-592,379
- Pramipexole
- Tibolone
- UK-414,495
