= C17H19N5 =

The molecular formula C_{17}H_{19}N_{5} (molar mass: 293.37 g/mol, exact mass: 293.1640 u) may refer to:

- ABT-724
- Anastrozole
