= Smart insulin patch =

Wearable medical device

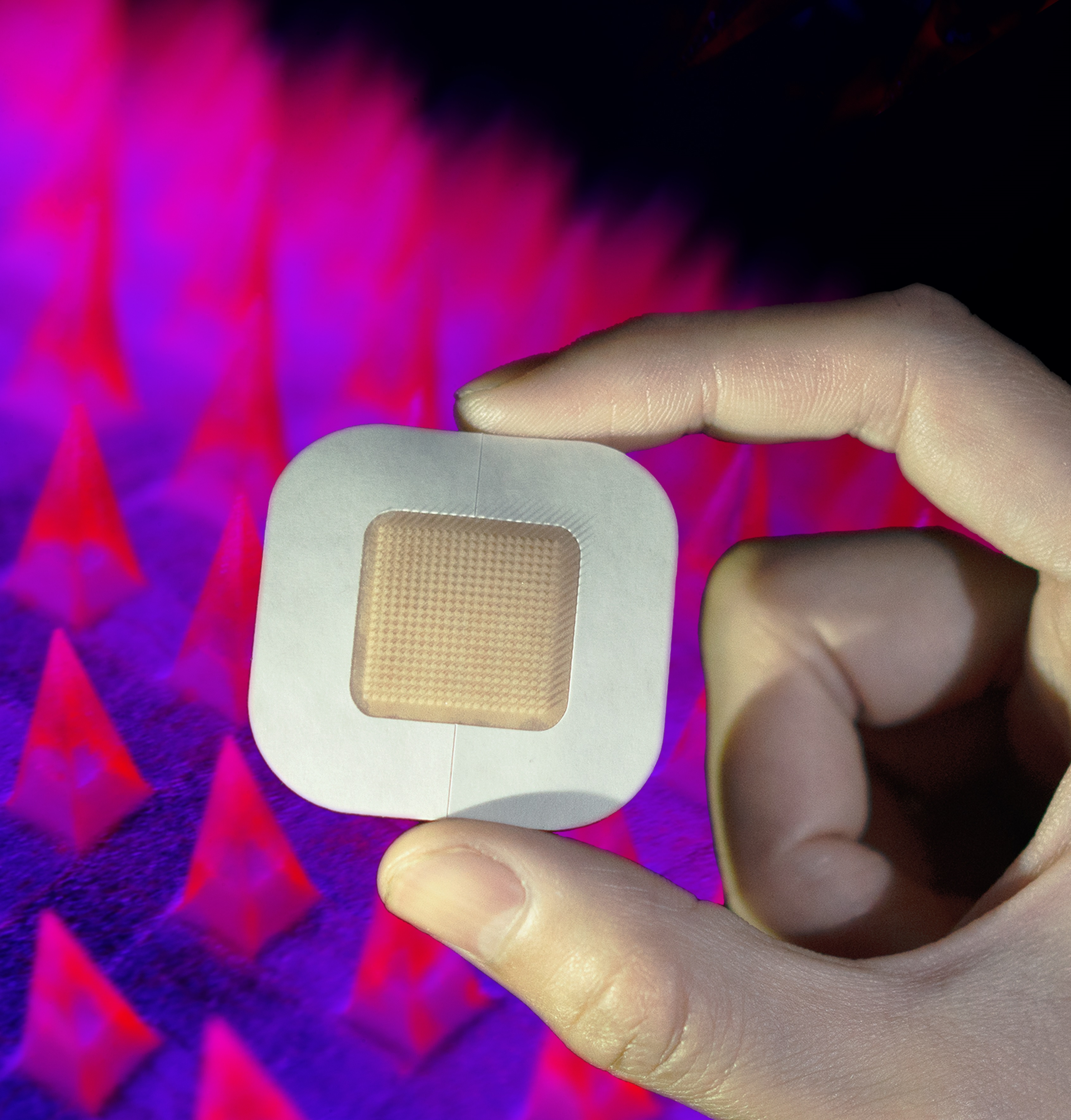
Smart insulin patch described in Nature Biomedical Engineering in 2020.

A smart insulin patch, also known as a glucose-responsive insulin patch, is a type of wearable medical device for diabetes treatment. It is a transdermal patch comprising glucose-sensitive microneedle-array loaded with insulin for blood glucose regulation. Once applied on the skin, the microneedles penetrate under the skin and can sense blood sugar levels. If glucose levels go up, it can promote the release of insulin, which is transported through the regional lymph and capillary vessels for glucose regulation.

== History ==
Insulin was introduced by Frederick Banting and Charles Best from the University of Toronto in 1921 as an injectable agent. Researchers first reported the concept of "smart insulin patch" in 2015. The prototype of smart insulin patch "was demonstrated as a continuous glucose control in a type 1 diabetic mouse model.

As of 2019, glucose-responsive insulin patches are becoming more common.

In 2020, scientists at UCLA and Zenomics Inc. developed "Smart Insulin Patch 2.0" and validated its feasibility in a diabetic minipig model.

Currently, Zenomics is applying for U.S. Food and Drug Administration (FDA) approval for first-in-human trials and the technology has been accepted into the FDA's Emerging Technology Program.
