= C16 =

C16 may refer to:

- HMS C16, a 1908 British C-class submarine
- Sauber C16, a 1997 racing car
- IEC 60320 C16, an electrical connector used for electric kettles and other small appliances
- C16, the ICD-10 code for stomach cancer
- Caldwell 16 (NGC 7243), an open cluster in the constellation Lacerta
- C16 (drug), a protein kinase inhibitor used in scientific research
- C16 Close Area Suppression Weapon, the Heckler & Koch GMG's Canadian designation
- The 16th century A.D.
- Commodore 16, a home computer
- Palmitic acid, a common saturated fatty acid

C-16 may refer to:

- C-16 highway (Spain), a highway in Catalonia
- C-16: FBI, a 1997–98 American TV series
- Bill C-16, a Canadian law regarding gender expression and gender identity
- The Cessna 208 airliner, as designated in the U.S. Army
- The French Defence, as coded in the Encyclopaedia of Chess Openings
- Carbon-16 (C-16 or ^{16}C), an isotope of carbon
