= C13H21N3O =

The molecular formula C_{13}H_{21}N_{3}O (molar mass: 235.32 g/mol, exact mass: 235.1685 u) may refer to:

- PF-592,379
- Procainamide (PCA)
