= Handel Lee =

American lawyer and businessman

- Traditional Chinese: 李景漢
- Simplified Chinese: 李景汉
Transcriptions
Standard Mandarin
- Hanyu Pinyin: Lǐ Jǐnghàn

Handel Lee is an international attorney and property developer known for transforming historic landmarks into upscale developments. He also currently is a senior partner at the law firm King & Wood Mallesons. Lee is best known for his high-end developments, including Beijing Legation Quarter and Three on the Bund in Shanghai. Ron Gluckman recognized him as China's "Style Setter" for his support of the arts.

== Personal life ==
Raised outside of Washington, DC, Lee first visited China, where both of his parents were born, in 1981. His mother is a native of Beijing, from a family with a long royal lineage from the Qing dynasty. His father Richard Lee, a recipient of the U.S. Department of Commerce's Gold Medal Award, grew up in Shanghai, but was born in Nanjing, where Lee's grandfather was the president of the Nanjing Union Theological Seminary. His mother, artist Dora Fugh Lee, was the second eldest sister of Major General John Fugh, whose wife June is journalist Connie Chung's sister. His mother's eldest sister, Aline Fugh Berman, was the mother of Georgetown University professor Adriane Fugh-Berman. Between studies at the University of Virginia and Georgetown University Law Center, Lee made more visits to China and spent several months learning Mandarin in at Peking University in 1982.

== Career ==
Lee relocated to China in 1991 to open the law office of U.S. firm Skadden, Arps, Slate, Meagher & Flom. After leaving Skadden, Lee practiced at the law firm of Vinson & Elkins as head of its China practice. Lee then joined King & Wood and served briefly as the firm's Chairman. Lee was among the first American lawyers to establish China practices for major U.S. firms and has been recognized as a leading practitioner in China in energy and mergers and acquisitions. He currently sits on the International Management Committee of King & Wood Mallesons.

Lee's business ventures typically combine his interests in Chinese contemporary art, blues and jazz music, motorcycles, and fine cuisine. His projects include some of China's most acclaimed developments, according to Forbes magazine, most notably the Beijing Legation Quarter/Ch'ienmen 23. The Courtyard, and Three on the Bund.

The Courtyard was a pioneering fine dining restaurant and art gallery that opened in 1996 and was popular with celebrities such as Mick Jagger and Arnold Schwarzenegger. The Courtyard Gallery was one of the first to showcase the emerging avant garde artists of China. Shanghai's Three on the Bund, a hundred-year-old, seven-story neo-classical building redesigned by architect Michael Graves, is host to galleries, luxury shops, and upscale restaurants. Many credit Lee and Three on the Bund for reinvigorating the city's historic riverfront as a center of tourism, dining, and nightlife when it opened in 2004.

== Recognition ==
For his contributions to the arts and culture, Lee was awarded the 2006 Montblanc Cultural Foundation's Arts Patronage Award and the title of Knight Commander, Order of the Star of Italian Solidarity in 2006. Lee is a member of the Committee of 100, a leadership organization of prominent Chinese Americans in business, government, academia and the arts.
