= S-17092 =

Chemical compound

Legal status
- Legal status: US: Investigational New Drug

Identifiers
- IUPAC name: [(2S,3aS,7aS)-1([(R,R)-2-phenylcyclopropyl]- carbonyl)-2-([thiazolidin-3-yl]carbonyl)octahydro-1H-indole
- CAS Number: 176797-26-5
- PubChem CID: 9977327
- ChemSpider: 8152919
- UNII: 8W5MLJ83KU
- CompTox Dashboard (EPA): DTXSID901028793

Chemical and physical data
- Formula: C_{23}H_{29}FN_{2}O_{2}
- Molar mass: 384.495 g·mol^{−1}
- 3D model (JSmol): Interactive image
- SMILES: O=C(N1CCCC1)[C@H]4N(C(=O)[C@H]3[C@H](c2ccc(F)cc2)C3)[C@H]5CCCC[C@H]5C4
- InChI: InChI=1S/C23H29FN2O2/c24-17-9-7-15(8-10-17)18-14-19(18)22(27)26-20-6-2-1-5-16(20)13-21(26)23(28)25-11-3-4-12-25/h7-10,16,18-21H,1-6,11-14H2/t16-,18-,19+,20-,21-/m0/s1; Key:JNUXCIMICQKTPX-RQUKQETFSA-N

S-17092 is a drug which acts as a selective inhibitor of the enzyme prolyl endopeptidase. This enzyme is involved in the metabolic breakdown of a number of neuropeptide neurotransmitters in the brain, and so inhibiting the action of the enzyme increases the activity of these neuropeptides. This produces nootropic effects which make S-17092 a promising and novel treatment for neurodegenerative conditions such as Alzheimer's disease and Parkinson's disease.

== See also ==
- C16 (PKR inhibitor)
- UK-414,495
