= IOMAI =

American biotech company

- Founded: 1997
- Founder: Gregory Glenn

IOMAI was a Biotech company founded in 1997 by Gregory Glenn M.D. of the Walter Reed Army Institute of Research and Dean Lewis, a World Bank employee. The company was the first to develop the concept of transcutaneous immunization, delivery of vaccines to the skin using a patch or similar method. This provided a means to stimulate robust immune responses safely as the skin patch-based immunization targeted Langerhans cells in the skin. The patch technology underwent extensive evaluation in the context of a traveler's diarrhea vaccine which entered Phase 3 pivotal trials in 2009. IOMAI was acquired by Intercell in 2008 and the technology was the subject of a development license to GSK in 2009. Dr. Glenn pioneered needle free delivery to the skin and spawned general interest in skin-targeting vaccine technologies, including intradermal delivery and the use of the heat labile toxin as an adjuvant and the adjuvant patch.

== History ==
Iomai Corporation was headquartered at 20 Firstfield Road, Gaithersburg, Maryland, and employed approximately 110 people at the time of its 2008 acquisition.

The company's transcutaneous immunization (TCI) technology, originally discovered by researchers at the Walter Reed Army Institute of Research, used the heat-labile toxin (LT) of Escherichia coli as an adjuvant to stimulate Langerhans cells in the outer layers of the skin, producing immune responses without the need for needles. Iomai traded on Nasdaq under the ticker symbol "IOMI" and by 2007 had roughly 25.5 million shares outstanding.

=== Government and industry partnerships ===
In January 2007, Iomai entered into a contract with the United States Department of Health and Human Services, potentially worth up to $128 million over five years, to develop a dose-sparing immunostimulant patch for use alongside injected pandemic influenza vaccines. Iomai also received Small Business Innovation Research (SBIR) awards, including funding to develop a transcutaneous anthrax vaccine.

In June 2007, Iomai announced publication in The Lancet of positive Phase II field-study data demonstrating efficacy of its travelers' diarrhea vaccine patch, which used the heat-labile toxin of enterotoxigenic E. coli (ETEC) delivered transdermally.

In April 2008, Iomai signed an agreement with Merck & Co. to conduct proof-of-principle preclinical studies evaluating use of Iomai's immunostimulant patch, as an adjuvant to boost the immune response of injected vaccines.

=== Acquisition by Intercell ===
On May 12, 2008, Intercell AG of Vienna, Austria, announced an agreement to acquire Iomai in an all-stock-and-cash deal valued at approximately $189 million or $6.60 per share. Intercell said the acquisition would diversify its vaccine portfolio and add three clinical and three preclinical vaccine candidates, complementing Intercell's Japanese encephalitis vaccine program.

Following a positive shareholder vote on August 1, 2008, and clearance from U.S. regulators, the acquisition closed. Intercell issued 1,442,819 new shares (about 3% of its outstanding shares) at €31.11 per share, plus a cash component of €75 million ($116 million), to Iomai's shareholders, warrant holders, and option holders.

Iomai Corporation was renamed Intercell USA, Inc., and continued to operate from its Gaithersburg, Maryland, facility as an Intercell subsidiary. Intercell's Chief Operating Officer, Thomas Lingelbach, became CEO of the new subsidiary, while Iomai founder Gregory Glenn was named Chief Scientific Officer. Iomai's former CEO, Stanley C. Erck, and former CFO, Russell P. Wilson, departed the company, and Iomai was delisted from Nasdaq.

== See also ==
- Transdermal patch
