= C16 (drug) =

Chemical compound

Identifiers
- IUPAC name: 6,8-Dihydro-8-(1H-imidazol-5-ylmethylene)-7H-pyrrolo[2,3-g]benzothiazol-7-one
- CAS Number: 608512-97-6
- PubChem CID: 6490494
- ChemSpider: 4990932
- UNII: C9Q75QZK84
- ECHA InfoCard: 100.211.648

Chemical and physical data
- Formula: C_{13}H_{8}N_{4}OS
- Molar mass: 268.29 g·mol^{−1}
- 3D model (JSmol): Interactive image
- SMILES: O=c3[nH]c2ccc1ncsc1c2c3=Cc4c[nH]cn4
- InChI: InChI=1S/C13H8N4OS/c18-13-8(3-7-4-14-5-15-7)11-9(17-13)1-2-10-12(11)19-6-16-10/h1-6H,(H,14,15)(H,17,18)/b8-3-; Key:VFBGXTUGODTSPK-BAQGIRSFSA-N

C16 (PKRi, GW 506033X) is a drug which acts as a selective inhibitor of the enzyme double-stranded RNA-dependent protein kinase (PKR). It has been shown to effectively inhibit PKR function in vivo and has neuroprotective and nootropic effects in animal studies. C16 has anti-viral activity, in A549 cells, against hemorrhagic viruses of mammarenaviruses such as lassa and junin.

== See also ==
- S-17092
