= Dora Fugh Lee =

Chinese-American artist (b. 1929)

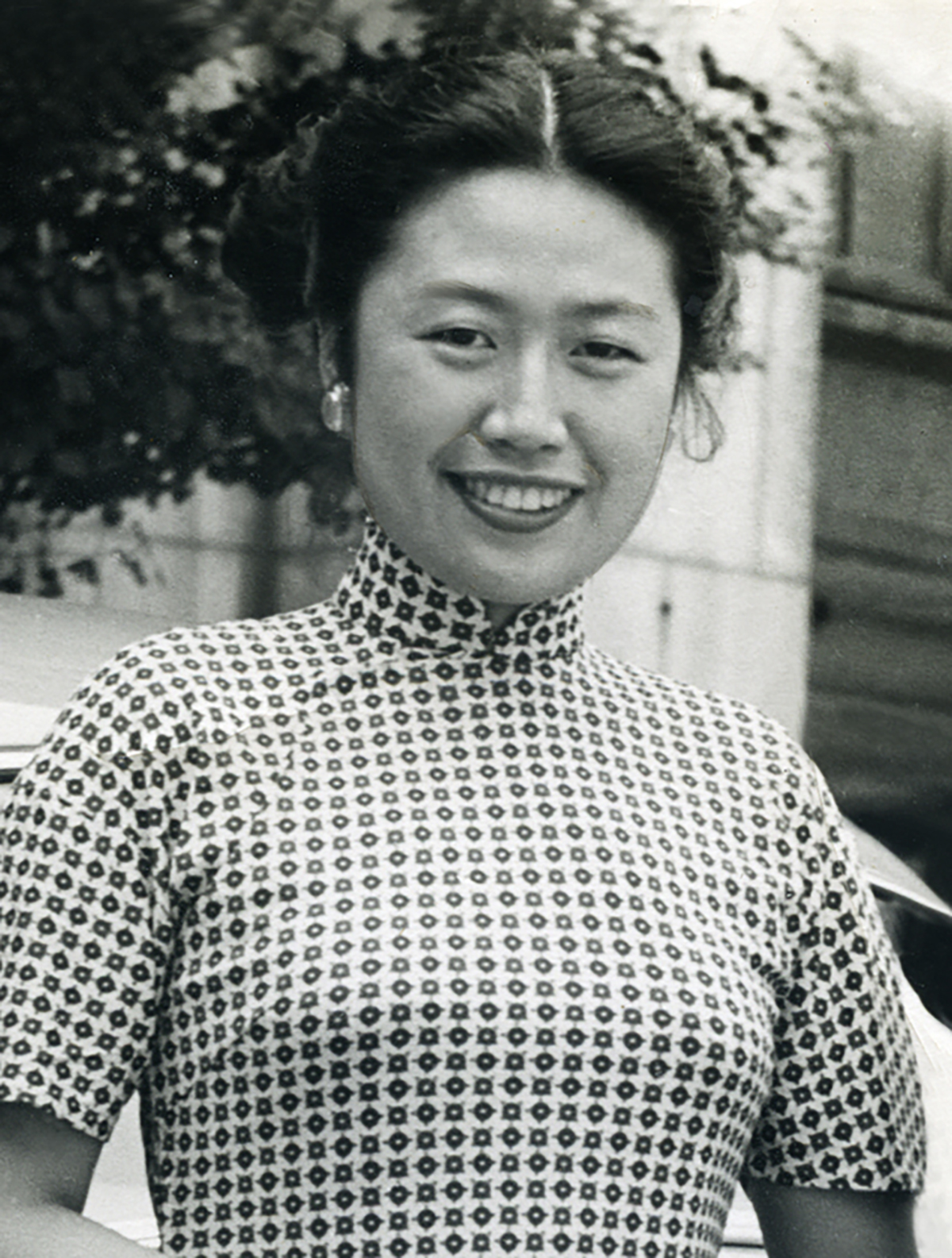
- Dora Fugh Lee
- Born: 1929; Beijing, China
- Occupation: Artist
- Children: Handel Lee

Dora Fugh Lee, nee Fu Duoruo, is a Chinese-American painter, illustrator, and sculptor born and classically trained in China. She is influenced by European styles. Her work has been recognized and added to prominent public and private art collections in Asia and North America including the Smithsonian Institution.

== Early life ==
When Lee was four years old, her grandfather, Fu Ruiqing, identified her as a promising artist and taught her ink painting and calligraphy. At age eleven, Lee began studying figure painting under renowned master Yan Shaoxing. Under Yan, she studied the Gongbi realistic portrait painting technique. While attending an all-girls Catholic school in Beijing, Lee studied under Zhao Mengzhua, a master of modern fine brushwork flower-and-bird painting. Zhao was a member of the Hu She art movement known as the “Cradle of Modern Chinese Painting."

Lee is a member of the Manchu Fuca clan and was born in Beijing in 1929. She descends from a line of distinguished military leaders, nobles, and artists with ties to both East and West. The first empress of the Qianlong Emperor, Empress Xiaoxianchun, Grand Secretary Fuheng, and Prince Fuk'anggan of the Qing Dynasty are among her ancestors.

== Career ==
Newlyweds Dora and Richard Lee moved to Tokyo, Japan in 1949, where she became a student of Pu Ru, the leading literati painter of modern China and cousin of Chinese emperor Pu Yi. In 1957, Dora Lee immigrated to Washington, DC, where she apprenticed under the Italian-American artist and sculptor Pietro Lazzari. She later taught Chinese painting and calligraphy at the Smithsonian Institution and George Washington University.

== Recognition and legacy ==
In her career, Lee earned over fifty distinguished awards. Her works are in the permanent collections of the Smithsonian Institution National Portrait Gallery, National Museum of Asian Art, the National Museum of Women in the Arts, the China Institute, the Pearl Buck Foundation, the National Cathedral, and the University of Virginia among other notable institutions.

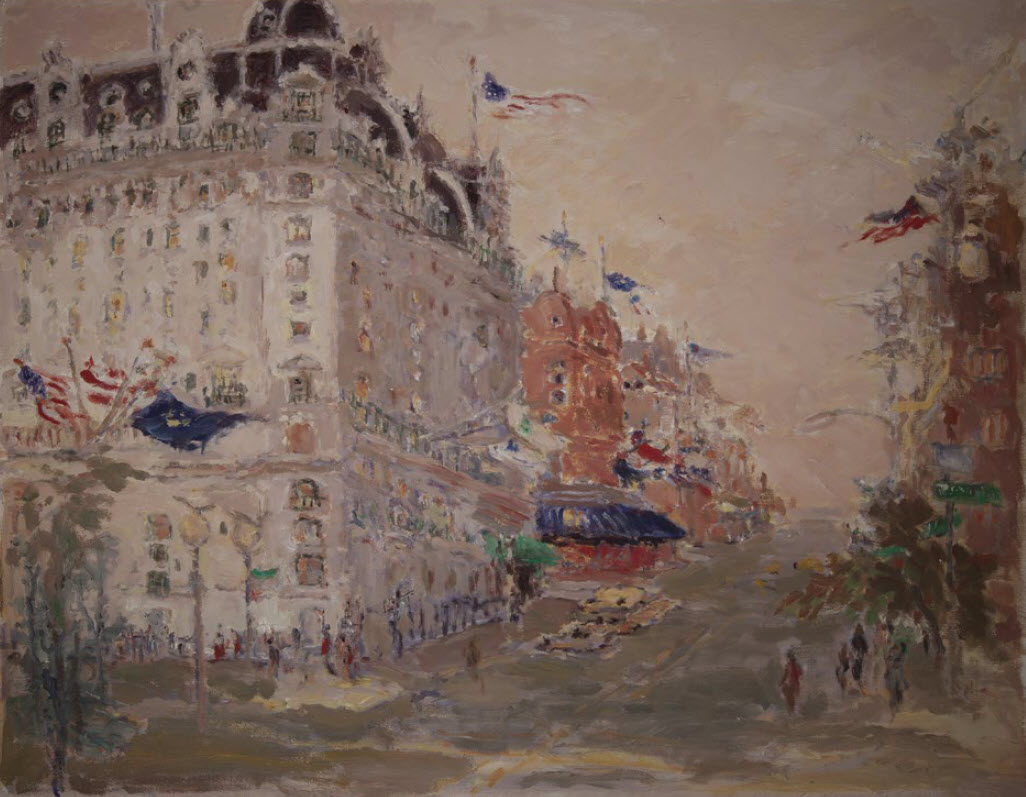
Oil painting by Dora Fugh Lee, Willard Hotel, Washington, DC 2004.
