= PF-592379 =

Dopamine receptor agonist compound

Clinical data
- Other names: PF592379; PF-000592379; PF000592379; PF-592,379
- Routes of administration: Oral
- Drug class: Dopamine D_{3} receptor agonist

Legal status
- Legal status: Investigational (discontinued)

Identifiers
- IUPAC name: 5-[(2R,5S)-5-methyl-4-propylmorpholin-2-yl]pyridin-2-amine
- CAS Number: 710655-15-5
- PubChem CID: 10263487
- IUPHAR/BPS: 7683
- ChemSpider: 8438966
- UNII: 66B7UY5K7I
- CompTox Dashboard (EPA): DTXSID901030407

Chemical and physical data
- Formula: C_{13}H_{21}N_{3}O
- Molar mass: 235.331 g·mol^{−1}
- 3D model (JSmol): Interactive image
- SMILES: CCCN([C@@H](C)CO1)C[C@H]1C2=CN=C(N)C=C2
- InChI: InChI=1S/C13H21N3O/c1-3-6-16-8-12(17-9-10(16)2)11-4-5-13(14)15-7-11/h4-5,7,10,12H,3,6,8-9H2,1-2H3,(H2,14,15)/t10-,12-/m0/s1; Key:DFTCYTDJDXZFSK-JQWIXIFHSA-N

PF-592379 is a drug developed by Pfizer which acts as a potent, selective and orally active agonist for the dopamine D_{3} receptor, which was under development as a potential medication for the treatment of female sexual dysfunction and male erectile dysfunction but was never marketed. Unlike some other less selective D_{3} agonists, a research study showed that PF-592379 has little misuse potential in animal studies, and so was selected for further development and potentially human clinical trials. Development has since been discontinued.

== See also ==
- List of investigational sexual dysfunction drugs
- 7-OH-DPAT
- PD-128,907
- PF-219,061
