= Microneedles =

Medical instruments

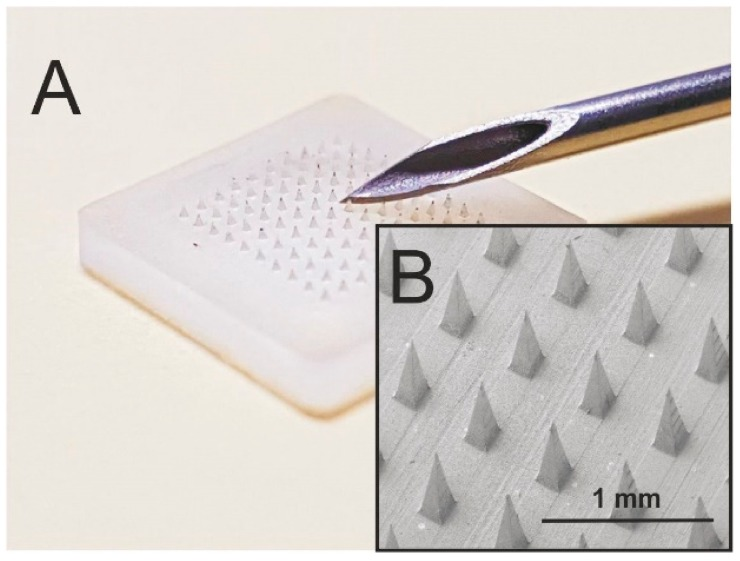
Side comparison of microneedle (350 μm in depth) to standard hollow-bore needle

Microneedles (MNs) are micron-scaled medical devices used to administer vaccines, drugs, and other therapeutic agents. The use of microneedles is known as microneedling. Microneedles are usually applied through even single needle or small arrays, called microneedle patch or microarray patch. The arrays used are a collection of microneedles, ranging from only a few microneedles to several hundred, attached to an applicator, sometimes a patch or other solid stamping device. The height of each needle ranges from 25 μm to 2000 μm. The arrays are applied to the skin of patients and are given time to allow for the effective administration of drugs.

While microneedles were initially explored for transdermal drug delivery applications, their use has been extended for the intraocular, vaginal, transungual, cardiac, vascular, gastrointestinal, and intracochlear delivery of drugs. Microneedles are also used in disease diagnosis, and collagen induction therapy. Although the concept of microneedling was first introduced in the 1970s, its popularity has surged due to its effectiveness in drug delivery and its cosmetic benefits.

Known for its minimally invasive and precise nature, microneedling is an easier method for physicians as microneedles require less training to apply and because they are not as hazardous as other needles, making the administration of drugs to patients safer and less painful while also avoiding some of the drawbacks of using other forms of drug delivery, such as risk of infection, production of hazardous waste, or cost.

Microneedles are constructed through various methods, usually involving photolithographic processes or micromolding. These methods involve etching microscopic structure into resin or silicon in order to cast microneedles. Microneedles are made from a variety of material ranging from silicon, titanium, stainless steel, and polymers. A variety of MNs types (solid, hollow, coated, hydrogel) has been developed to possess different functions. Some microneedles are made of a drug to be delivered to the body but are shaped into a needle so they will penetrate the skin. The microneedles range in size, shape, and function but are all used as an alternative to other delivery methods like the conventional hypodermic needle or other injection apparatus. Stimuli-responsive microneedles are advanced devices that respond to environmental triggers such as temperature, pH, or light to release therapeutic agents. The research on MNs has led to improvements in different aspects, including instruments and techniques, yet adverse events are possible in MNs users.

== History ==
The concept of microneedles was first derived from the use of large hypodermic needles in the 1970s, but it only became prominent in the 1990s as microfabrication manufacturing technology developed. Later, the concept of MNs finally came into experimentation in 1994 when Orentreich discovered the insertion of tri-beveled needles to the skin could possibly stimulates the release of fibrous strand. The investigation on MNs' potential to improve transdermal drug delivery gradually raised public awareness of MNs. Since then, there has been massive research conducted on MNs, contributing to the development of different materials, types, and fabrication methods of MNs. Application and adverse events are explored. In the 2000s, clinical trials on MNs' use in drug delivery began.

Microneedles were first mentioned in a 1998 paper by the research group headed by Mark Prausnitz at the Georgia Institute of Technology that demonstrated that microneedles could penetrate the uppermost layer (stratum corneum) of the human skin and were therefore suitable for the transdermal delivery of therapeutic agents. Subsequent research into microneedle drug delivery has explored the medical and cosmetic applications of this technology through its design. This early paper sought to explore the possibility of using microneedles in the future for vaccination. Since then researchers have studied microneedle delivery of insulin, vaccines, anti-inflammatories, and other pharmaceuticals. In dermatology, microneedles are used for scarring treatment with skin rollers. As mentioned before, microneedles have also been explored for local targeted drug delivery at other drug delivery sites, such as the gastrointestinal, ocular, vascular etc., of which, ocular, vaginal and gastrointestinal have shown increasingnly convincing outcomes where they serve as a more efficient, localised drug delivery system, without the drawbacks of systemic exposure/toxicity.

The major goal of any microneedle design is to penetrate the skin's outermost layer, the stratum corneum (10–15 μm). Microneedles are long enough to cross the stratum corneum but not so long that they stimulate nerves which are located deeper in the tissues and therefore cause little to no pain.

Research has shown that there is a limit on the type of drugs that can be delivered through intact skin. Only compounds with a relatively low molecular weight, like the common allergen nickel (130 Da), can penetrate the skin. Compounds that weigh more than 500 Da cannot penetrate the skin.

== Materials ==
Microneedles (MNs) consist of micro-sized needles arrays that are made of various materials exhibiting different characteristics and are suitable in the synthesis of different types of MNs. The selection of materials for formation of MNs greatly depends on the strength of skin penetration, manufacturing method, and rate of drug release.

Silicon is the first material used for the production of MNs. While the flexible nature of silicon allows easy manufacture of different sizes and types of MNs, silicon MNs can easily fracture during insertion in the skin. On the contrary, MNs made of metals like stainless steel, titanium, and aluminum, are non-toxic and possess strong mechanical properties to penetrate the skin without breakage. Nevertheless, metal MNs may cause allergic effects in some patients and it creates non-biodegradable wastes.

Polymer is also regarded as a promising material for MNs due to its good biocompatibility and low toxicity. Water-soluble polymers are more commonly used within the big polymer group and MNs tip breaking is more likely compared to MNs made of silicon and metal. Therefore, polymer is a more suitable material for dissolving MNs or hydrogel-forming MNs.

== Types ==
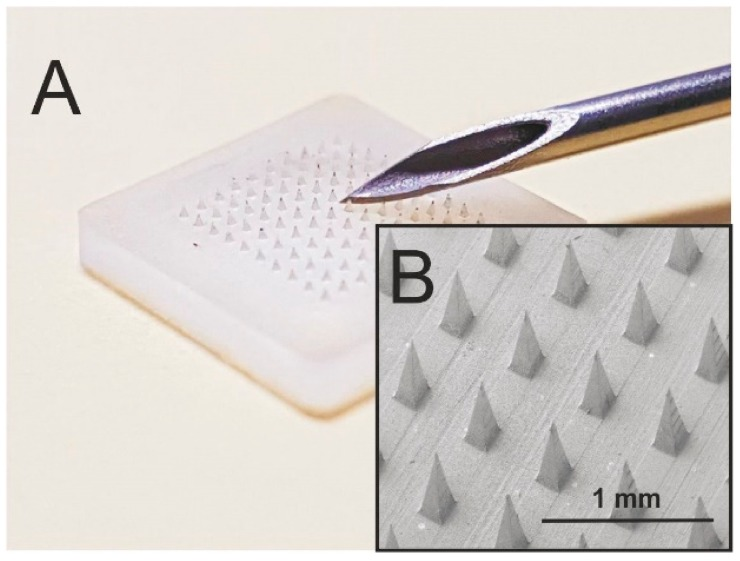
(A) Comparison between hypodermic needle and microneedle. (B) Magnification of microneedle.

Since their conceptualization in 1998, several advances have been made in terms of the variety of types of microneedles that can be fabricated. The five main types of microneedles are solid, hollow, coated, dissolvable/dissolving, and hydrogel-forming. The distinct characteristic of each type of MNs allow a variety of clinical applications, including diagnosis and treatment.

Micro-sized needles in a microneedles (MNs) device can be as short as 25 μm or even 2000 μm in length depending on their types.

=== Solid microneedles ===
Solid MNs are the first type of MNs fabricated and are the most commonly used. Hard solid MNs have sharp tips that pierce through and form pores on the stratum corneum. A drug patch will then be applied to the skin for drug to be absorbed slowly and passively through numerous micropores.

This type of array is designed as a two part system; the microneedle array is first applied to the skin to create microscopic wells just deep enough to penetrate the outermost layer of skin, and then the drug is applied via transdermal patch. Solid microneedles are already used by dermatologists in collagen induction therapy, a method which uses repeated puncturing of the skin with microneedles to induce the expression and deposition of the proteins collagen and elastin in the skin.

Solid MNs help increase the permeability and absorption of drugs.

=== Hollow microneedles ===
Hollow MNs are designed with a hole at the tip and a hollow capacity that store drugs. Upon MNs insertion, the stored drug is directly injected into the dermis and this effectively facilitates the absorption of either large-molecular or large-dosage drug. Yet, a portion of the drug can leaked or become clogged, and may hinder the overall drug administration. Since the delivery of the drug depends on the flow rate of the microneedle, this type of array could become clogged by excessive swelling or flawed design. This design also increases the likelihood of buckling under the pressure and therefore failing to deliver any drugs.

=== Coated microneedles ===
Coated MNs are fabricated by coating drug solution over solid MNs and the thickness of the drug layer can be adjusted depending on the amount of drug to be administered. A benefit of coated MNs is that less of the drug is needed as compared to other drug administration routes. This is because the layer of drug will quickly dissolve and delivered into the systemic circulation directly across the skin. The solid MNs which are removed afterwards may be contaminated by left-over drugs and the reuse of those MNs raise the concern of cross-infection between patients.

Coated microneedles are often covered in other surfactants or thickening agents to assure that the drug is delivered properly. Some of the chemicals used on coated microneedles are known irritants. While there is risk of local inflammation to the area where the array was, the array can be removed immediately with no harm to the patient.

=== Dissolving microneedles ===
Dissolving MNs are mostly composed of water-soluble drugs that enable the dissolution of MN tips when inserted into skin. This is a one-step approach which does not require the removal of MNs and is convenient for long-term therapy. However, incomplete insertion and delay dissolution is observed with the use of dissolving MNs.

This polymer would allow the drug to be delivered into the skin and could be broken down once inside the body. Pharmaceutical companies and researchers have begun to study and implement polymers such as fibroin, a silk-based protein that can be molded into structures like microneedles and dissolved once in the body.

=== Hydrogel-forming microneedles ===
The primary material for the fabrication of hydrogel-forming microneedles (HFMs) is hydrophilic polymer that encloses drugs. This material draws water from interstitial fluid in the stratum corneum and results in polymer swelling and release of drug. Besides, the hydrophilic features of HFMs allow readily uptake of interstitial fluid that could be used for disease diagnosis.

== Application and principle ==
=== Transdermal drug delivery ===
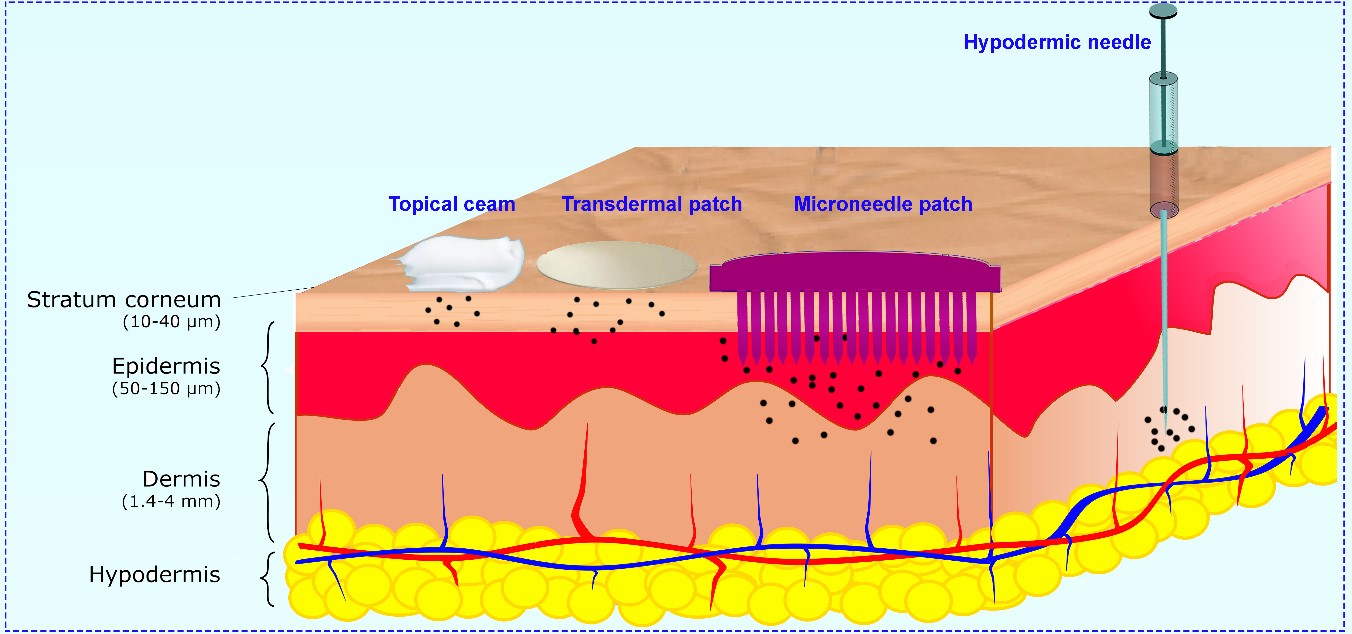
Common transdermal drug administration route

The most abundant transdermal drug administration route currently is via hypodermic needles, transdermal patches, and topical creams. However, these routes have limited therapeutic effects because stratum corneum serves as a barrier that reduces the entry of drug molecules into the systemic circulation and target tissues. The invention of MNs have retained the benefits of both hypodermic needles and transdermal patches while minimizing their cons.

Compared to hypodermic needles, MNs provide a pain-free administration. MNs are able to penetrate through the epidermis, but not any deeper to compress on nerve-ends to produce pain responses. The superficial penetration also lessens the infection risk.

Compared to transdermal patches, MNs are proven to be effective in producing micropores on the epidermis. The micropores facilitate the absorption of large molecules, like calcein and insulin, by 4 times via in-vitro skin models. In addition, MNs' direct drug delivery to systemic circulation avoided the first-pass effect in the liver. Significantly increasing the drug bioavailability, and the fast absorption into the systemic circulation also allowed a fast onset of action. Therefore, MNs could benefit diabetes treatment as common oral delivery would lead to a significant loss of insulin from degradation in the liver (first-pass effect) and insulin molecules are too large to be absorbed using common transdermal patches.

Furthermore, the high precision of MNs also allows drug reaching to localized tissues precisely, for instance, intradermal layers for cancer or the eye for ophthalmic disorder.

==== Vaccination ====
MNs are suitable for vaccination with their capability to deliver macromolecules and maintain a slow and sustained release of vaccine agents by using both coated and dissolving MNs. In addition, MNs' biodegradability minimizes biohazardous waste, unlike hypodermic needles. The application of MNs in vaccination would benefit people who avoid vaccination due to trypanophobia (fear of needles in medical settings). As of 2024, it has been found to generate an immune response similar to injection of measles and rubella vaccine.

=== Disease diagnosis and monitoring ===
Disease diagnosis and monitoring of therapeutic efficacy is possible by detecting several biomarkers in body fluid. However, current tissue fluid extraction methods are pain-inducing, and it may take up to hours or days for samples to be analyzed in medical laboratories. MNs could collect body fluid in an almost painless manner, and it could provide immediate diagnosis when combined with a sensor.

MNs allow penetration through the epidermis but not long enough to compress nerves in deeper layers, and thus, they are minimally invasive and almost painless. MNs' precision also allow the extraction of fluid surrounding diseased tissues, which may contain higher concentration of different biomarkers and specific biomarkers that are not present in the systemic circulation. These fluids provide more clinically significant and accurate values than those extracted from the systemic circulation, subsequently lowering the chances of underestimation of disease severity, especially for localized diseases.

Furthermore, MNs are capable of providing (near) real-time diagnosis, and it is easily administrated with simple procedures. Thus, MNs are potential candidates for point-of-care (PoC) testing which could be conducted bedside.

Hollow MNs and hydrogel MNs could be used to diagnose and monitor several diseases including cataracts, diabetes, cancer, and Alzheimer's disease. For instance, hollow glass MNs and hydrogel MNs could extract skin interstitial fluid for the detection of glucose levels.

=== Collagen induction therapy ===
In the field of dermatology, MNs are more commonly known as collagen induction therapy. The therapy induces dermis regeneration via repetitive perforation of the skin using sterilized MNs. The repetitive penetration through the stratum corneum forms micropores, and these physical traumas to the skin sequentially stimulate the wound-healing cascade and expression of collagen and elastin in the dermis.

By making use of the human natural regeneration properties, microneedling could be used alone to treat scars, wrinkles, and skin rejuvenation, or in combination therapy with topical tretinoin and vitamin C for enhanced effect. Recent research has expanded the possibilities of MNs to treat pigmentation disorder, actinic keratosis, and promote hair growth in patients of androgenetic alopecia and alopecia areata.

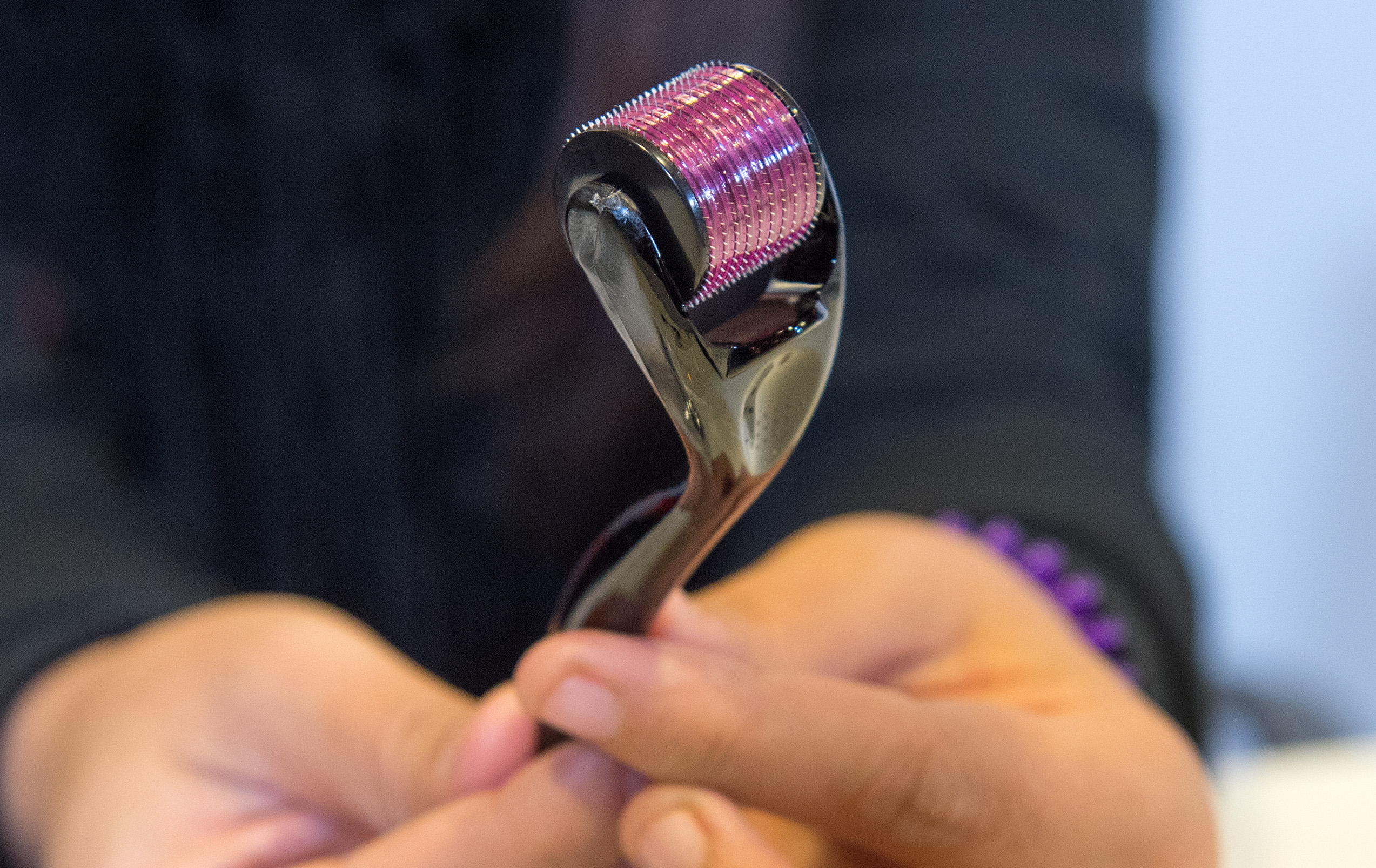
A Dermaroller composed of shorter microneedles. It is designed for cosmetic purposes.

MNs have been diverged into different forms, including Dermapen and Dermarollers. Dermarollers are hand-held rollers equipped with a total of 192 solid steel micro-sized needles arranged into 24 arrays, lengths ranging from 0.5 to 1.5 mm. With the growing popularity of microneedling, MNs have also been commodified into home care Dermarollers, which are similar to medical dermarollers, except that the needles are shorter (0.15 mm). This is a more budget-friendly device that allows individuals to perform microneedling at home.

== Advantages ==
There are many advantages to the use of microneedles, the most prominent being the improved comfort of patients. Needle phobia can affect both adults and children, and sometimes can lead to fainting. The benefit of microneedle arrays is that they reduce anxiety that patients have when confronted with a hypodermic needle. In addition to improving psychological and emotional comfort, microneedles have been shown to be substantially less painful than conventional injections. Some studies recorded children's views on blood sampling with microneedles and found patients were more willing when prompted with a less painful procedure than traditional sampling with needles. Microneedles are beneficial to physicians as well, since they produce less hazardous waste than needles and are generally easier to use. Microneedles are also less expensive than needles as they require less material and the material used is cheaper than the materials in hypodermic needles.

Microneedles present a new opportunity for home and community-based healthcare. One of the biggest drawbacks of traditional needles is the hazardous waste that they produce, making disposal a serious concern for doctors and hospitals. For patients who require regular administration of medication at home, disposal can become an environmental concern is needles are placed in the trash. Dissolvable or swelling microneedles would provide those who are limited in their ability to seek hospital care with the ability to safely administer drugs in the comfort of their homes, although disposal of solid or hollow microneedles could still pose a needle-stick or blood borne pathogen infection risk.

Another benefit of microneedles is their lower rates of microbial invasion into delivery sites. Traditional injection methods can leave puncture wounds for up to 48 hours post-treatment. This leaves a large window of opportunity for harmful bacteria to enter into the skin. Microneedles only damage the skin to a depth of 10–15 μm, making it difficult for bacteria to enter the bloodstream and giving the body a smaller wound to repair. Further research is required to determine the types of bacteria able to breach the shallow puncture site of microneedles.

== Disadvantages ==
There are some concerns about how physicians can be sure that all of the drug or vaccine has entered the skin when microneedles are applied. Hollow and coated microneedles both possess the risk that the drug will not properly enter the skin and will not be effective. Both of these types of microneedles can leak onto a person's skin either by damage of the microneedle or incorrect application by the physician. This is why it is essential that physicians are trained how to properly apply the arrays.

Another concern is that incorrectly applied arrays could leave foreign material in the body. Although there is a lower risk of infection associated with microneedles, the arrays are more fragile than a typical hypodermic needle due to their small size and thus have a chance of breaking off and remaining in the skin. Some of the material used to construct the microneedles, such as titanium, cannot be absorbed by the body and any fragments of the needles would cause irritation.

There is a limited amount of literature available on the subject of microneedle drug delivery, as current research is still exploring how to make effective needles. In terms of design and manufacture, low drug loading is a key barrier towards reaching the clinics.

== Safety profile ==
Apart from procedural pain, some common post-treatment adverse events (AEs) of MNs include temporary discomfort, erythema (skin redness), and edema. Pinpoint bleeding, itching, irritation, and bruising are also possible in some cases. However, most of the adverse side effects are not long-lasting and could be resolved spontaneously within 24 hours after the treatment, making MNs a rather safe tool. Photoprotection and minimal exposure to chemicals irritants are often advised for an effective recovery and lowered chance of skin inflammation.

Severe risks may be possible if there are technical errors during the procedure. For example, the usage of non-sterile tools might result in post-inflammatory hyperpigmentation, systemic hypersensitivity, local infections, etc. Moreover, if excess pressure is used over a bony prominence, it could lead to "Tram-track scarring". But this could be avoided by using smaller needles and prevent over-pressurizing on top of these areas. In addition, if the patient is allergic to the either the drug used or the material of MNs, contact dermatitis is possible. Therefore, clinicians should be cautious towards patients with high risks of allergy.
