= Sunita Sah =

University professor, researcher, and book author

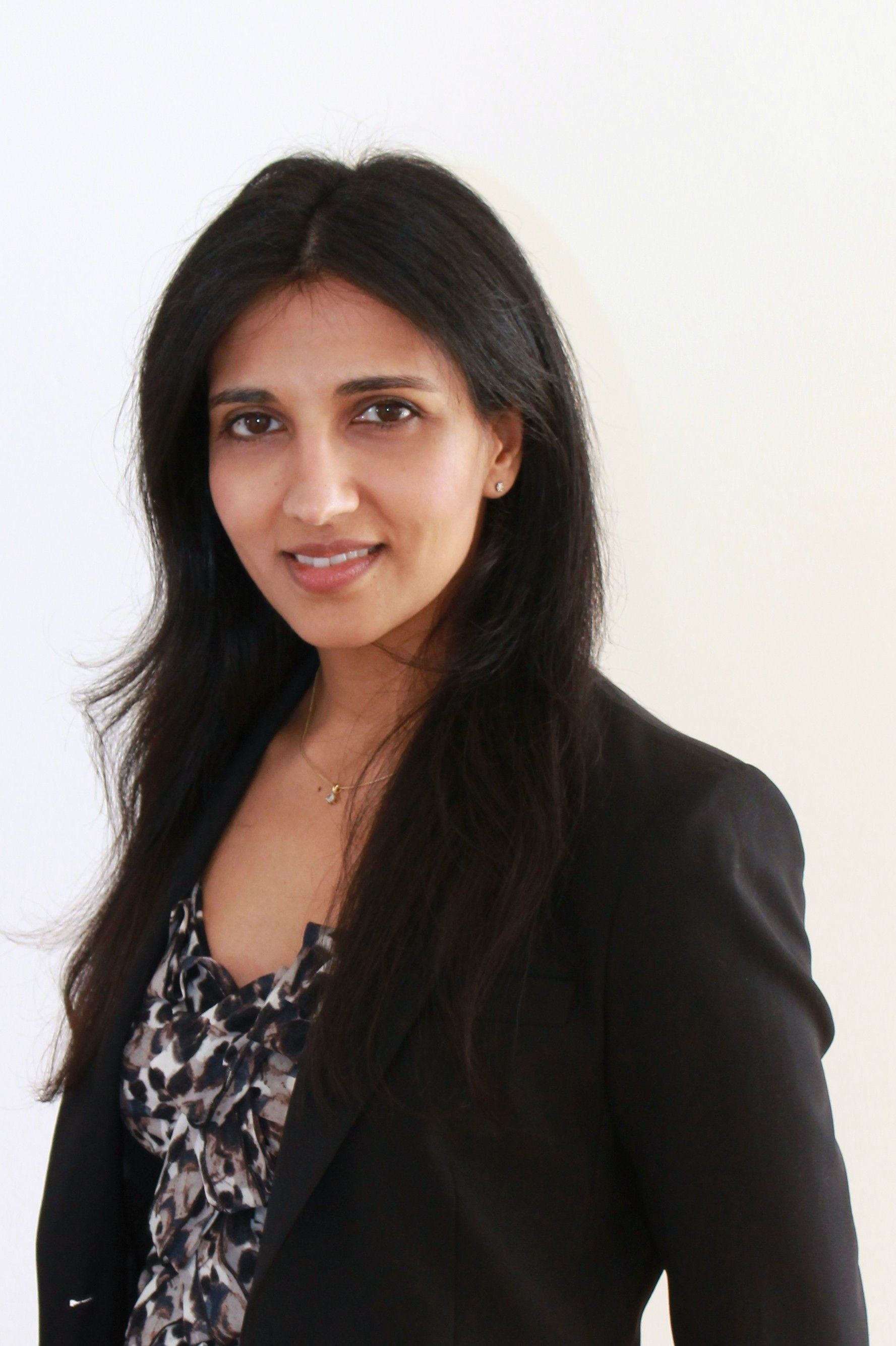
- Occupations: Professor and author
- Writing career
- Subject: Management psychology
- Website: www.sunitasah.com

Sunita Sah is a professor of management and organizations at Cornell University's SC Johnson Graduate School of Management, and a core faculty fellow in the new Cornell Health Policy Center. Her book, Defy: The Power of No in a World that Demands Yes, was published by Penguin Random House in January 2025. Sah is the director of Cornell University's Academic Leadership Institute. She was formerly the KPMG Professor of Management Studies at Cambridge Judge Business School of the University of Cambridge, where she remains an Honorary Fellow.

== Early life and education ==
Sah grew up in England and attended Greenhead College in Huddersfield, West Yorkshire. She attended Edinburgh University and earned a B.Sc. (Hons) in psychology and a MBChB (UK equivalent of the US MD) in medicine and surgery. She worked as a junior doctor at the Western General Hospital before moving into management consultancy. She moved to the United States in 2008 and earned an M.S. and Ph.D. in organizational behavior in 2010 at Carnegie Mellon University's Tepper School of Business.

== Career ==
Sah is known internationally for her research on conflicts of interest and disclosure, behavioral ethics, influence, compliance, and defiance. She identified the "panhandler effect" and "insinuation anxiety" in advisor-advisee dynamics. She revealed how conflict of interest disclosures can increase compliance and have unintended effects. Her research on forensic science demonstrates how a lack of scientific rigor in forensic processes can lead to improper conviction and incarceration.

Among her speaking engagements, Sah was the keynote speaker at Morgan Stanley's 2024 Women in Leadership Summit. She also keynoted at the Executive MSc Programme Graduation and Alumni Event for the London School of Economics.

=== Selected awards ===
- Mid-Career Achievement Award, Health Care Management, Academy of Management 2022
- Elected Fellow, Society for Personality and Social Psychology, 2020
- Elected Fellow, Society of Experimental Social Psychology, 2020
- Visiting Scholar Fellowship, Russell Sage Foundation, 2019–2020
- US Department of Justice Certificate of Recognition for Service on the National Commission of Forensic Science, 2017
- Best Paper Award, Managerial and Organizational Cognition, Academy of Management, 2017
- Fellowship Award, Harvard University, Edmond J. Safra Center of Ethics, 2011–2015
- Best Paper Award, Managerial and Organizational Cognition, Academy of Management, 2011
- Best Paper Award, Society for Business Ethics, 2010

=== Selected publications ===
- Sah, S. (2024). "Deep Professionalism: Charting a path for effective conflict-of-Interest management." Journal of General Internal Medicine.
- Sah, S. (2023). "The paradox of disclosure: Shifting policies from revealing to resolving conflicts of interest." Behavioural Public Policy 1–12.
- Sah, S. (2022). "The professionalism paradox: A sense of professionalism increases vulnerability to conflicts of interest." Academy of Management Perspectives, 36(3), 896–918.
- Rose, S., Sah, S., Dweik, R., Schmidt, C., Mercer, M., Mitchum, K., Karafa K., & Robertson, C. (2021). "Patient responses to physician disclosures of industry conflicts of interest: A randomized field experiment." Organizational Behavior and Human Decision Processes, 166, 27–38.
- Sah, S., & Read, D. (2020). "Mind the (information) gap: Strategic non-disclosure by marketers and interventions to increase consumer deliberation." Journal of Experimental Psychology: Applied, 26 (3), 432–452.
- Jatoi, I, & Sah, S. (2019). "Clinical practice guidelines and the overuse of healthcare services: Need for reform." Canadian Medical Association Journal, 191(11), 297–298.
- Sah, S., Loewenstein, G., & Cain, D. (2019). "Insinuation anxiety: Concern that advice rejection will signal distrust after conflict of interest disclosures." Personality and Social Psychology Bulletin, 45(7), 1099-1112.
- Bell, S., Sah, S., Albright, T., Gates, J., Denton, B., & Casadevall, A. (2018). "A call for more science in forensic science." Proceedings of the National Academy of Sciences, 115(18), 4541–4544.
- Sah, S. (2017). "Policy solutions to conflicts of interest: The value of professional norms." Behavioural Public Policy, 1(2), 177-189.
- Sah, S. (2017). "Let's Keep the Science in Forensic Science." Scientific American, 317(4), 12.
- Sah, S. (2015). "Investigations before examinations: This is how we practice medicine here." JAMA Internal Medicine, 175(3), 342–343.
- Sah, S., Robertson, C., & Baughman, S. (2015). "Blinding prosecutors to defendants’ race: A policy proposal to reduce unconscious bias in the criminal justice system." Behavioral Science and Policy, 1(2), 69-76.
- Sah, S., Loewenstein, G., & Cain, D. (2013). "The burden of disclosure: Increased compliance with distrusted advice." Journal of Personality and Social Psychology, 104(2), 289–304.
- Sah, S., & Fugh-Berman, A. (2013). "Physicians under the influence: Social psychology and industry marketing strategies." Journal of Law, Medicine and Ethics, 41(3), 665–672.
- Sah, S. (2023, November 21). "Speak Up at Thanksgiving, Your Health Demands It: A Psychologist’s Tip for Making It Through the Holiday Season." The New York Times.
- Sah, S. (2023, July 13). "Most people believe they don’t see color—but only empirically proven “blinding” policies can reduce discrimination in the labor market and criminal justice system." Fortune.
- Sah, S. (2022, December 8). "For Justice, Forensic Science Must Be Scientific: The Case of Kevin Keith." Forbes.
- Sah, S. (2021, October 26). "What to Do About “Back to the Office” Jitters." Harvard Business Review.
- Sah, S. (2021, June 3). "Pressure to return to the office could be making employees more anxious." The Conversation.
- Sah, S. (2019, October 22). "Why You Find it so Hard to Resist Taking Bad Advice." The Los Angeles Times.
- Sah, S., & Read, D. (2017, September 28). "Missing Product Information Doesn’t Bother Consumers as Much as It Should." Harvard Business Review.
- Sah, S., Casadevall, A., Bell, S., Gates, J., Albright, T., & Denton, B. (2017, May 8). "We Must Strengthen the 'Science' in Forensic Science." Scientific American.
- Sah, S. (2016, July 8). "The Paradox of Disclosure." The New York Times.
