= Mark Prausnitz =

Chemical engineer

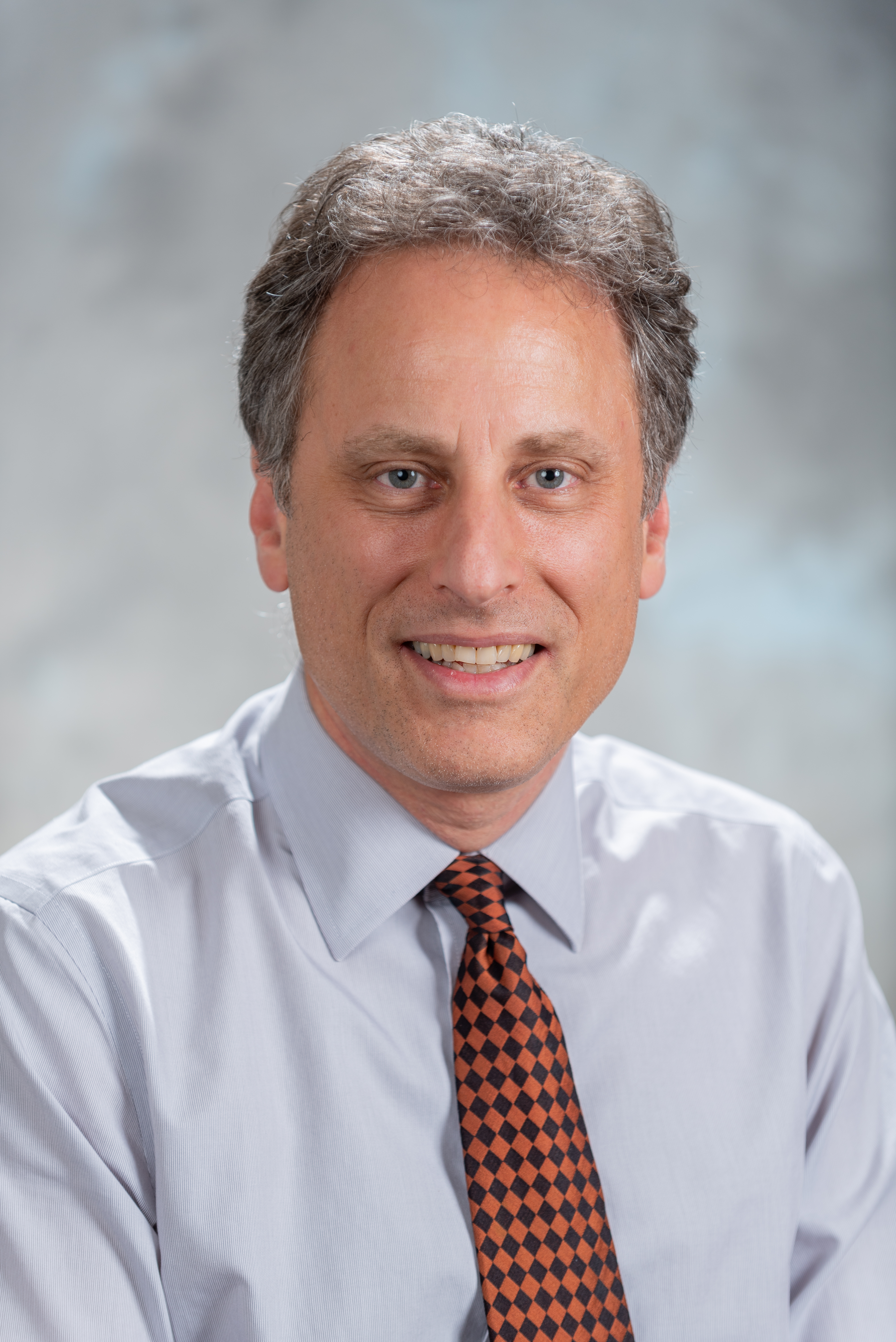
- Education: Stanford University B.S., 1988 Massachusetts Institute of Technology Ph.D., 1994
- Known for: Drug Delivery
- Spouse: Cindy Weinbaum
- Children: Hannah Prausnitz-Weinbaum, Mia Prausnitz-Weinbaum, Samuel Prausnitz-Weinbaum
- Awards: Fellow, American Institute for Medical and Biological Engineering (2009) Fellow, National Academy of Inventors (2014) Fellow, American Association of Pharmaceutical Scientists (2017) Fellow, Controlled Release Society (2018)
- Scientific career
- Fields: Biomedical Engineering
- Workplaces: Georgia Institute of Technology
- Doctoral advisor: Robert S. Langer, James C. Weaver
- Website: https://drugdelivery.chbe.gatech.edu/

Mark Robert Prausnitz is an American chemical engineer, currently Regents' Professor, Regents' Entrepreneur and J. Erskine Love, Jr. Chair in Chemical & Biomolecular Engineering at the Georgia Institute of Technology. He also serves as Adjunct Professor of Biomedical Engineering at Emory University and Adjunct Professor of Chemical & Biomolecular Engineering at the Korea Advanced Institute of Science and Technology. He is known for pioneering microneedle technology for minimally invasive drug and vaccine administration, which has found applications in transdermal, ocular, oral, and sustained release delivery systems.

He has published almost 350 research papers in collaboration with over 100 different senior collaborations in universities, industry partners, and government. His publications have been cited more than 63,000 times with an h-index of 123 as of March 2025. He is also inventor on more than 70 US patents (issued or pending).

== Biography ==
Prausnitz received his bachelor's degree in chemical engineering from Stanford University in 1988. He joined ALZA corporation as junior chemical engineer (1988–1989) where he worked on transdermal drug delivery systems. He then pursued graduate studies at Massachusetts Institute of Technology (MIT) under the supervision of Robert S. Langer and James Weaver, and received his Ph.D. degree in chemical engineering in 1994, for a thesis "Electroporation of Tissue and Cells for Drug Delivery Applications".

== Teaching ==
At Georgia Tech, he co-developed and taught with Andreas Bommarius two new interdisciplinary courses with a pharmaceutical focus – "Drug Design, Development, and Delivery" and "Pharmaceutical Development".

== Contributions to science and medicine ==
=== Drug and vaccine delivery to the skin using microneedle patches ===
Prausnitz is best known as the founder of Microneedle drug delivery, having published the first paper on microneedle use for drug delivery in 1998, conducted the first clinical trials of drug and vaccine delivery using microneedles, founded ten companies based on the technologies. His microneedle patches painlessly applied to the skin for simplified vaccination have been studied in a phase 1/2 clinical trial of measles and rubella vaccination in West Africa with the Bill and Melinda Gates Foundation.

In 2007, Prausnitz published the first paper on ocular drug delivery using microneedles. In 2011, he co-founded Clearside Biomedical to further develop his foundational work on suprachoroidal space (SCS) delivery via microneedles for targeted injection into the eye, which is now the basis for an FDA-approved product to treat macular edema (Xipere®). He has collaborated at Emory University and elsewhere to develop hollow and solid microneedle systems to target drug delivery to sites of action within the eye in both the posterior and anterior segments.

=== Transdermal drug delivery using electroporation and other methods ===
He published the first paper on skin electroporation and demonstrated its feasibility for transdermal drug delivery in 1993.

He has studied mechanisms of creating transient pores in cell membranes to promote intracellular delivery of biomolecules using electroporation, ultrasound-mediated cavitation, and laser-activated nanoparticles.

== Personal life ==
Mark Prausnitz is the son of University of California, Berkeley professor John Prausnitz.

== Co-founded companies ==
Prausnitz is an entrepreneur who has co-founded several companies:

- Redeon (acquired by BioValve Technologies)
- Microneedle Systems
- Clearside Biomedical
- Micron Biomedical
- Microstar Biotech
- Aldena Therapeutics (acquired by Alys Pharmaceuticals)
- Vimela Therapeutics (acquired by Alys Pharmaceuticals)
- Alys Pharmaceuticals
- Piezo Therapeutics
- Serene Ophthalmic

== Awards and honors ==
- Fellow, American Institute for Medical and Biological Engineering (2009)
- Fellow, National Academy of Inventors (2014)
- Fellow, American Association of Pharmaceutical Scientists (2017)
- Fellow, Controlled Release Society (2018)
- Member, National Academy of Engineering (2023)
- Member, National Academy of Medicine (2024)
