= Testosterone (patch) =

Medication

The testosterone patch, brand name Intrinsa among others, was designed to treat female sexual dysfunction.

== Mechanism of action ==
Testosterone patches works by releasing the hormone testosterone through the skin into the bloodstream. In women, testosterone is naturally produced by the ovaries and the adrenal gland. However, levels of the hormone decline with age, sometimes more after menopause. Testosterone therapy is systemic and needs to be applied over a period of weeks or months to have an effect. P&G licensed the treatment to Watson Pharmaceuticals.

== Approval ==
The patch was granted a license from the European Medicines Agency in July, and is available on Britain's National Health Service from March 2007.

However, in December 2004 the United States the 14-member Food and Drug Administration (FDA) advisory committee, plus voting consultants, for Reproductive Health Drugs unanimously rejected Procter and Gamble's fast-track request for Intrinsa citing concerns about off-label use. In Canada, post-menopausal women have been able to obtain government-approved testosterone treatment since 2002. In Australia, post-menopausal women can use Organon testosterone implants which have to be surgically inserted and last from three to six months.

== See also ==
- List of androgens available in the United States
- Bremelanotide
- Flibanserin
- Melanotan II
