= Serotonin–norepinephrine–dopamine reuptake inhibitor =

Class of drugs

A serotonin–norepinephrine–dopamine reuptake inhibitor (SNDRI), also known as a triple reuptake inhibitor (TRI or TUI), is a type of drug that acts as a combined reuptake inhibitor of the monoamine neurotransmitters serotonin, norepinephrine, and dopamine, resulting in increased signaling in associated neurological systems.

SNDRIs were developed as potential antidepressants and treatments for other disorders, such as obesity, cocaine addiction, attention deficit hyperactivity disorder (ADHD), and chronic pain. The goal of such development was improved efficacy or tolerability over existing selective serotonin reuptake inhibitors (SSRIs), serotonin–norepinephrine reuptake inhibitors (SNRIs), and dopamine–norepinephrine reuptake inhibitors (NDRIs). However, increased side effects and abuse potential are concerns when using these agents, relative to their more selective counterparts.

SNDRIs include the naturally occurring drug cocaine, a widely used recreational and often illegal drug for the euphoric effects it produces. Additionally, MDMA, another common drug of abuse, is also an SNDRI, however its reuptake inhibition is comparatively weak compared to its properties as a serotonin–dopamine–norepinephrine releasing agent.

== Indications ==
SNDRIs have been studied for a number of indications, but primarily for that of depression, and ADHD.

Preclinical and clinical research indicates that drugs inhibiting the reuptake of all three of these neurotransmitters can produce a more rapid onset of action and greater efficacy than traditional antidepressants.

=== Applications other than depression ===
- Alcoholism (cf. DOV 102,677)
- Cocaine addiction (e.g., indatraline)
- Obesity (e.g., amitifadine, tesofensine)
- Attention deficit hyperactivity disorder (ADHD) (cf. NS-2359, centanafadine)
- Chronic pain (cf. bicifadine)
- Parkinson's disease

== Cocaine ==
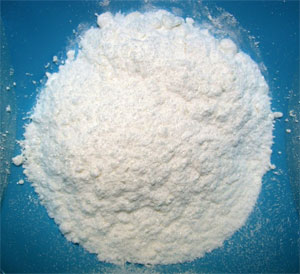
Cocaine in powder form.

Cocaine is a short-acting SNDRI that also exerts auxiliary pharmacological actions on other receptors. Cocaine is a relatively "balanced" inhibitor, although facilitation of dopaminergic neurotransmission is what has been linked to the reinforcing and addictive effects. Cocaine users may experience symptoms of extreme fatigue, decreased mood, and a "crash" following the original euphoria of the drug; subsequent to the crash, users begin to crave for more. In addition, cocaine has some serious limitations in terms of its cardiotoxicity due to its local anesthetic activity. Thousands of cocaine users are admitted to emergency units in the USA every year because of this; thus, development of safer substitute medications for cocaine abuse could potentially have significant benefits for public health.

Many of the SNDRIs currently being developed have varying degrees of similarity to cocaine in terms of their chemical structure. There has been speculation over whether the new SNDRIs will have an abuse potential like cocaine does. However, for pharmacotherapeutics, treatment of cocaine addiction is advantageous if a substitute medication is at least weakly reinforcing because it can serve to retain addicts in treatment programs.

... limited reinforcing properties in the context of treatment programs may be advantageous, contributing to improved patient compliance and enhanced medication effectiveness.

== Legality ==
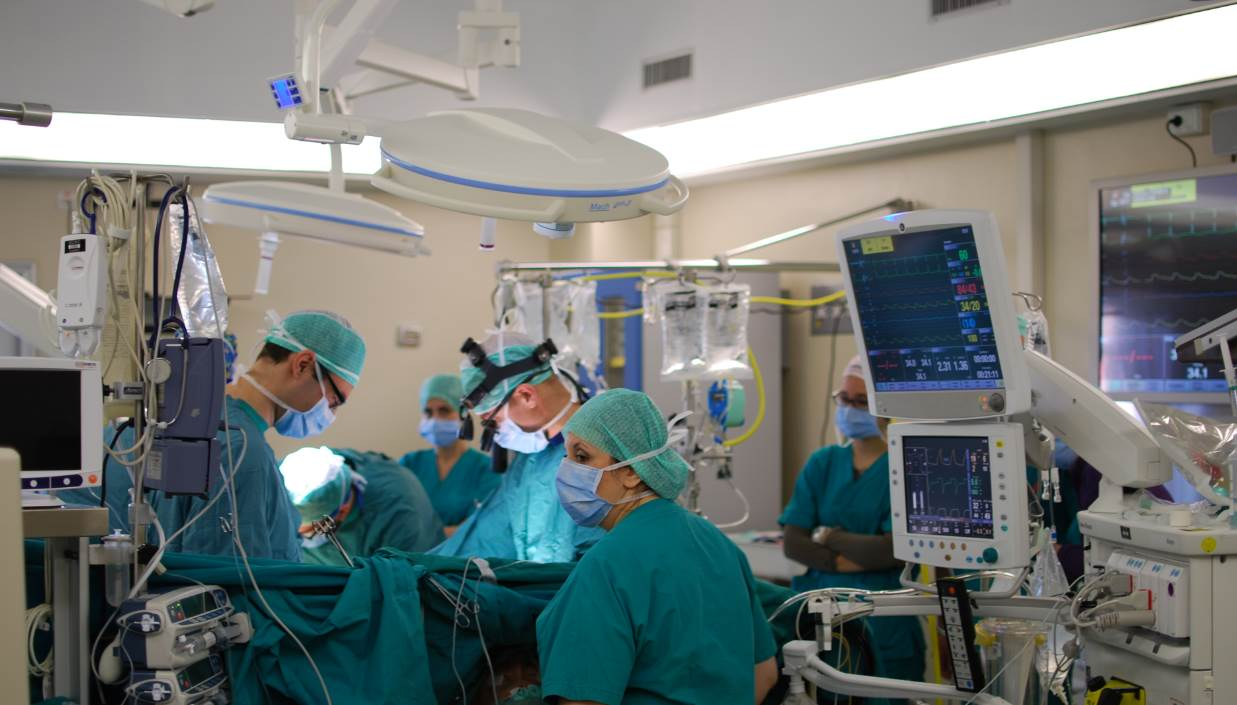
Cocaine can be used as a local anesthetic for certain surgeries.

Cocaine is a controlled drug (Class A in the UK; Schedule II in the USA); it has not been entirely outlawed in most countries, as despite having some "abuse potential" it is recognized as useful for surgery considering it is a local anesthetic that can be applied to areas such as the nose, mouth, or throat for numbing purposes.

Brasofensine, a dopamine reuptake inhibitor developed to treat Parkinson's disease, was made "class A" in the UK under the MDA (misuse of drugs act). The semi-synthetic procedure for making brasofensine uses cocaine as the starting material.

Naphyrone, a drug that inhibits monoamine transporters, first appeared in 2006 as one of quite a large number of analogs of pyrovalerone designed by the well-known medicinal chemist P. Meltzer et al. When the designer drugs mephedrone and methylone became banned in the United Kingdom, vendors of these chemicals needed to find a suitable replacement. Mephedrone and methylone affect the same chemicals in the brain as a SNDRI, although they are thought to act as monoamine releasers and not act through the reuptake inhibitor mechanism of activity. A short time later, mephedrone and methylone were banned (which had become quite popular by the time they were illegalized), naphyrone appeared under the trade name NRG-1. NRG-1 was promptly illegalized, although it is not known if its use resulted in any hospitalizations or deaths.

=== Self-Administration of Drugs ===
According to various studies, the relative likelihood of rodents and non-human primates self-administering various psychostimulants that modulate monoaminergic neurotransmission is lessened as the dopaminergic compounds become more serotonergic. This finding has been found for amphetamine and some of its variously substituted analogs including PAL-287 etc. RTI-112 is another good example of the compound becoming less likely to be self-administered by the test subject in the case of a dopaminergic compound that also has a marked affinity for the serotonin transporter.

Further evidence that 5-HT (serotonin) dampens the reinforcing actions of dopaminergic medications comes from the co-administration of psychostimulants with SSRIs, and the phen/fen combination was also shown to have limited abuse potential relative to administration of phentermine only. However, not all SNDRIs are reliably self-administered by animals. Examples include:

- PRC200-SS was not reliably self-administered.
- RTI-112 was not self-administered because at low doses the compound preferentially occupies the SERT and not the DAT.
- Tesofensine was also not reliably self-administered by human stimulant addicts.
- The nocaine analog JZAD-IV-22 only partly substituted for cocaine in animals, but produced none of the psychomotor activation of cocaine, which is a trait marker for stimulant addiction.

== Failure of SNDRIs for depression ==
SNDRIs have been under investigation for the treatment of major depressive disorder for a number of years but, as of 2015, have failed to meet effectiveness expectations in clinical trials. In addition, the augmentation of a selective serotonin reuptake inhibitor (SSRI) or serotonin-norepinephrine reuptake inhibitor with lisdexamfetamine, a norepinephrine–dopamine releasing agent, recently failed to separate from placebo in phase III clinical trials of individuals with treatment-resistant depression, and clinical development was subsequently discontinued. These occurrences have shed doubt on the potential benefit of dopaminergic augmentation of conventional serotonergic and noradrenergic antidepressant therapy. As such, skepticism has been cast on the promise of the remaining SNDRIs that are still being trialed. Despite this, SNDRIs such as toludesvenlafaxine (formerly "ansofaxine") is currently approved in China for depression, and is preparing to recruit for phase IV clinical trials, as United States approval continues to be worked on. Additionally, centanafadine, another SNDRI, is also currently under development for depression, having completed phase II trials in May 2025.

Despite being a weak SNDRI, nefazodone has been successful in treating major depressive disorder.

== Known SNDRIs ==
=== Approved pharmaceuticals ===
- Centanafadine (Simtriyo) — psychostimulant; Received FDA approval in 2026 for the treatment of ADHD in adult and pediatric patients aged 6 and older.
- Mazindol (Mazanor, Sanorex) — anorectic; k_{i} is 50 nM for SERT, 18 nM for NET, 45 nM for DAT
- Nefazodone (Serzone, Nefadar, Dutonin) — antidepressant; non-selective; k_{i} is 200 nM at SERT, 360 nM at NET, 360 nM at DAT
- Nefopam — analgesic, K_{i} SER/NE/DA = 29/33/531 nM)
- Toludesvenlafaxine (Ansofaxine, LY03005/LPM570065). Completed Phase 2 & 3 trials. FDA accepted NDA application. Approved in China.

Sibutramine (Meridia) is a withdrawn anorectic that is an SNDRI in vitro with k_{i} values of 298 nM at SERT, 5451 at NET, 943 nM at DAT. However, it appears to act as a prodrug in vivo to metabolites that are considerably more potent and possess different ratios of monoamine reuptake inhibition in comparison, and in accordance, sibutramine behaves contrarily as an SNRI (73% and 54% for norepinephrine and serotonin reuptake inhibition, respectively) in human volunteers with only very weak and probably inconsequential inhibition of dopamine reuptake (16%).

Venlafaxine (Effexor) is sometimes referred to as an SNDRI, but is extremely imbalanced with k_{i} values of 82 nM for SERT, 2480 nM for NET, and 7647 nM for DAT, with a ratio of 1:30:93. It may weakly inhibit the reuptake of dopamine at high doses.

==== Coincidental ====
- Esketamine (Ketanest S) — anesthetic; S-enantiomer of ketamine; weak SNDRI action likely contributes to effects and abuse potential
- Ketamine (Ketalar) — anesthetic and dissociative drug of abuse; weak SNDRI action likely contributes to effects and abuse potential
- Phencyclidine (Sernyl) — discontinued anesthetic and dissociative psychostimulant drug of abuse; SNDRI action likely contributes to effects and abuse potential
- Tripelennamine (Pyribenzamine) — antihistamine; weak SNDRI; sometimes abused for this reason
- Lamotrigine (Lamictal) — Anticonvulsant; weak SNDRI; IC_{50} is 240μM (human platelets) / 474 μM (rat brain synaptosomes) for SERT, 239 μM for NET, 322 μM for DAT
- Mepiprazole

=== Undergoing clinical trials ===
- BMS-866949 (made from diclofensine precursor)
- Cendifensine (NOE-115)
- OPC-64005 — In phase 2 trials (2022)
- Lu AA37096 — see here (SNDRI and 5-HT_{6} modulator)
- NS-2360 — principle metabolite of tesofensine
- Pudafensine
- Tesofensine (NS-2330) (2001) In trials for obesity.
- SEP-432 was in stage 1 clinical trials but not yet in stage 2 or stage 3.
  - IC50 values in patent for compound 225: hSERT=7nM, hNET= 23nM, hDAT=167nM. Although in the earlier patent (277 on scheme 36) IC50 values (nM) of hSERT=34, NET=13 & DAT=41.
  - SEP-432 has a chemistry that is related to sibutramine and bromadol & Levocabastine & 3',4'-dichloromeperidine.

SEP-432

=== Failed clinical trials ===
- Bicifadine (DOV-220,075) (1981)
- Brasofensine (NS-2214, BMS-204,756) (1995)
- Diclofensine (Ro 8–4650) (1982)
- DOV-216,303 (2004)
- EXP-561 (1965) SAR analogy with U-32,802A suggests that incorporation of a butyrophenone sidechain might be consistent with antipsychotic properties. The para-bromo derivative of EXP-561 was "a potent and relatively selective inhibitor of uptake into serotonin neurones".
- Liafensine (BMS-820,836)
- NS-2359 (GSK-372,475)
- SEP-227,162
- SEP-228,425
- Amitifadine (DOV-21,947, EB-1010) (2003)
- Dasotraline (SEP-225,289)
- Lu AA34893 — see here (SNDRI and 5-HT_{2A}, α_{1}, and 5-HT_{6} modulator)
- Tedatioxetine (Lu AA24530) — SNDRI and 5-HT_{2C}, 5-HT_{3}, 5-HT_{2A}, and α_{1} modulator

=== Designer drugs ===
- 3-Methyl-PCPy
- Naphyrone (O-2482, naphthylpyrovalerone, NRG-1) (2006)
- 5-APB

=== Research compounds (no record of having been taken by humans) ===
3,4-Diphenylpiperidine

MDL 47,832

3,4-Diphenylquinuclidine

- McNeil Laboratories: McN-4612, McN5652, JNJ-7925476 (2008; first appeared in 1987), McN 5707 [96795-88-9] & Mcn-5292 [105234-89-7] & McN-5558 (labelled as SNRI though).
- MDL 47,832 [52423-89-9] has a SAR that is similar to RG-7166 & Amitifadine. Further details of the SAR study can be seen under Osanetant.
- 3,3-Diphenylcyclobutanamine (1978)
- AK Dutta: D-161 (2008) D-473 [1632000-05-5] & D-578. Informative review:
- DOV-102,677 (2006–2011) Informative reviews:
- Fezolamine (Win-41,528-2)
- GlaxoSmithKline (Italia): GSK1360707F (2010): CID:46866510:
- HP-505
- Lundbeck group: Indatraline (1985), Lu-AA42202 & CID:11515108 [874296-10-3].
- Kozikowski group: DMNPC (2000), JZ-IV-10 (2005) & JZAD-IV-22 (2010)
- Lilly group: LR-5182 (maybe only NDRI) (1978) CID:9903806:
  - CID:11335177 CID:9867350 CID:11234430
- HM Deutsch group: Methylnaphthidate (HDMP-28) (2001)
- MI-4 MI-4 is the same compound as Ro-25-6981 [169274-78-6]. This is NMDA antagonist.
- Benzazepine derivatives: SKF-83,959 (2013) & Nor-Trepipam [20569-49-7]:
- Various phenyltropanes, such as WF-23, dichloropane, and RTI-55
- NeuroSearch group: NS9775, NS18283. & 4-Benzhydryl-1,2,3,6-tetrahydropyridine [1186529-81-6].
  - CID:54673194 (k_{i} S/N/D = 0.26/6.0/4.8 nM)
  - CID:9921901 [387869-25-2], 3-(3,4-Dichlorophenyl)-tropan-2-ene (S/N/D = 4.7/26/79 nM)
- Liming Shao (Sepracor/Sunovion). 3',4'-Dichlorotramadol, CID:53321058 (S/N/D = 19/04/01 nM).
  - A patent review was also disclosed:
  - CID:66809062: CID:46870521 CID:10151573 CID:46701015
- Takeda group, CID:44629033 (k_{i} S/N/D = 11/14/190 nM) Ref: Patent:
- Trudell group: HK3-263 (k_{i} S/N/D = 0.3/20/16 nM):
- Pfizer group CP-607366 & CP-939689.
  - Desmethylsertraline — active metabolite of sertraline; k_{i} is 76 nM for SERT, 420 nM for NET, 440 nM for DAT
  - 3,4-Dichlorotametraline (trans-(1R,4S)-sertraline) (1980)
- Venlafaxine analogues, LPM580098 & LPM580153. And TP1 later reassigned name to PA01.
  - PRC (Carlier) group: PRC200-SS (2008), PRC050, and PRC025.
- Albany Molecular Research group (Bruce Molino) AMR-2 (k_{i} is DAT 3.1 nM, SERT 8.3 nM, NET 3.0 nM):
  - CID:49765424 (S)-enantiomer: [1254941-82-6]:
- SK Group: SKL-10406 CID:44555333 & CID:49866033
- Boots UK: BTS 74,398, SPD-473 citrate: [161190-26-7]
- Pridefine
- SMe1EC2M3
- SIPI5357 (CID:52939791): & SIPI5056 (CID:69055942):
- 23j-S (k_{i} S/N/D = 83/3.8/160 nM):
- Tetrazoles (ROK):
- 10dl (CID:118713802) (k_{i} S/N/D 7.6/45.2/330 nM):
- 2at (CID:118706539):
- THIQ Derivatives: AN12 (CID:10380161): Patent: CID:9839278:
- 2j (CID:66572162) (k_{i} S/N/D = 411/71/159 nM):
- 6aq (CID:70676472) (k_{i} S/N/D 44/10/32 nM):
- Naphthyl milnacipran analog (2007), CID:17748230 (k_{i} S/N/D = 18/05/140 nM).
- Benzazepine derivatives, e.g. Nortrepipram [20569-49-7]. SKF-83959
- Roche: RG-7166 (PC44231267), PC52950556 PC58017238 See also:
- Lafadofensine
- Diphenylbutylpiperazines: FG5865, FG5891, FG-5893, FG5909.
- Flunamine [50366-32-0] Primary: (led to vanoxerine)
- SRI-29574 [1928712-46-2] (Rothman) Patent:

=== Herbals ===
- Cocaine — natural alkaloid and drug of abuse extracted from plants of the genus Erythroxylum
- Ginkgo biloba extract (EGb761) — "The norepinephrine (NET), the serotonin (SERT), the dopamine (DAT) uptake transporters and MAO activity are inhibited by EGb761 in vitro"
- St John's Wort — a natural product and over-the-counter herbal antidepressant which contains:
  - Hyperforin
  - Adhyperforin
  - Uliginosin B — IC_{50} DA = 90 nM, 5-HT = 252 nM, NE = 280 nM
- Oregano extract.
- Although not specifically a SNDRI, Rosmarinus officinalis is one of the trimonoamine modulator (TMM) that affect SER/CAs.
- Hederagenin
- Yuanzhi-1 (Polygala tenuifolia).

== See also ==
- List of antidepressants
- Selective serotonin reuptake inhibitor (SSRI)
- Serotonin–norepinephrine reuptake inhibitor (SNRI)
- Monoamine reuptake inhibitor (MRI)
