= Liafensine =

Chemical compound

Clinical data
- Routes of administration: By mouth
- ATC code: None

Legal status
- Legal status: Investigational New Drug

Identifiers
- IUPAC name: 6-[(4S)-2-Methyl-4-(2-naphthyl)-1,2,3,4-tetrahydro-7-isoquinolinyl]-3-pyridazinamine
- CAS Number: 1198790-53-2
- PubChem CID: 58212050
- DrugBank: DB14878
- ChemSpider: 29271896
- UNII: R34ID086Z6
- KEGG: D10443
- CompTox Dashboard (EPA): DTXSID60152610

Chemical and physical data
- Formula: C_{24}H_{22}N_{4}
- Molar mass: 366.468 g·mol^{−1}
- 3D model (JSmol): Interactive image
- SMILES: CN1C[C@H](C2=C(C1)C=C(C=C2)C3=NN=C(C=C3)N)C4=CC5=CC=CC=C5C=C4
- InChI: InChI=1S/C24H22N4/c1-28-14-20-13-19(23-10-11-24(25)27-26-23)8-9-21(20)22(15-28)18-7-6-16-4-2-3-5-17(16)12-18/h2-13,22H,14-15H2,1H3,(H2,25,27)/t22-/m0/s1; Key:VCIBGDSRPUOBOG-QFIPXVFZSA-N

Liafensine (DB104, formerly BMS-820836) is an serotonin–norepinephrine–dopamine reuptake inhibitor (SNDRI) which is under development for the treatment of major depressive disorder. It works by blocking the reuptake of serotonin, norepinephrine, and dopamine—three key neurotransmitters in the brain—which may help alleviate symptoms of depression by enhancing their availability in synaptic spaces. This mechanism differentiates it from many existing antidepressants, such as selective serotonin reuptake inhibitors (SSRIs) or serotonin–norepinephrine reuptake inhibitors (SNRIs), by also targeting dopamine pathways.

== Chemistry ==
Chemically, it is 6-((4S)-2-methyl-4-(2-naphthyl)-1,2,3,4-tetrahydro-7-isoquinolinyl)-3-pyridazinamine.

== History ==
Liafensine was discovered and initially developed by Albany Molecular Research Inc. (AMRI) to incrementally advance antidepressant treatment by synergizing the individual monoaminergic approaches to treating depression. Bristol-Myers Squibb (BMS) licensed liafensine from AMRI in 2005 and conducted further nonclinical studies and all clinical development, including two Phase 2b trials for the monotherapy treatment of adult patients with TRD. Liafensine was well tolerated, with no evidence of dose-dependent discontinuations due to adverse events. However, BMS terminated the program in 2013 after the Phase 2b trials failed to show superior treatment effect over control (escitalopram and duloxetine). In 2017, After BMS returned the rights back to AMRI, Denovo licensed liafensine from AMRI (now Curia) with exclusive rights for the development, manufacture, and commercialization of liafensine globally. It is being developed by Denovo Biopharma (Denovo) as a monotherapy for the treatment of ANK3 biomarker-positive adult patients with treatment-resistant depression (TRD).

In March 2020, using its proprietary artificial intelligence (AI) and whole genome sequencing (WGS)-based Denovo Genomic Marker (DGM™) biomarker platform, Denovo discovered a novel pharmacogenomic biomarker, DGM4 (Denovo Genomic Marker 4), which is associated with liafensine’s efficacy to treat TRD. DGM4 is a single nucleotide polymorphism (SNP) located in ANK3 gene that is known to be associated with bipolar disorder, PTSD, and other psychiatric disorders. The prevalence of the DGM4 (aka ANK3) biomarker is approximately 20% in most ethnic groups.

In October 2024, US Food and Drug Administration (FDA) granted Fast Track designation for liafensine being developed for treating patients with TRD. It represents a potential advancement in precision psychiatry, possibly the first biomarker-guided therapy for TRD.

== Clinical studies ==
Based on this finding, Denovo initiated a biomarker-guided global Phase 2b clinical trial (the “ENLIGHTEN” study) to assess the safety and efficacy of liafensine in patients with TRD in 2022. In April 2024, Denovo announced that ENLIGHTEN, the first genetic biomarker-guided TRD studies that enrolled 197 TRD patients, had completed and successfully met all study endpoints. DGM4-positive patients with TRD who received liafensine demonstrated highly significant improvements over the 6-week treatment period compared to those who received placebo. The primary endpoint was met: the change in Montgomery-Åsberg Depression Rating Scale (MADRS) total score from baseline for liafensine demonstrated a 4.4-point improvement over placebo (p = 0.0056). The secondary endpoints were also met: changes in both Clinical Global Impression-Severity (CGI-S) and Sheehan Disability Scale (SDS) from baseline for liafensine showed an approximately 36% improvement over placebo; Clinical Global Impression-Improvement (CGI-I) was 2.3 for liafensine, a 0.6-point improvement over placebo (p = 0.0026). Liafensine was well tolerated and demonstrated an excellent safety profile consistent with previous clinical trials which included more than 2,200 subjects. The ENLIGHTEN results were published in JAMA Psychiatry.

== See also ==
- Amitifadine
- Centanafadine
- GSK-372475 (NS-2359)
