= Dichloropane =

Chemical compound

Clinical data
- ATC code: none

Legal status
- Legal status: UK: Under Psychoactive Substances Act; US: Schedule II

Identifiers
- IUPAC name: Methyl (1R,2S,3S,5S)-3-(3,4-dichlorophenyl)-8-azabicyclo[3.2.1]octane-2-carboxylate
- CAS Number: 146725-34-0
- PubChem CID: 127024
- ChemSpider: 112783
- UNII: V7SQE82R87
- CompTox Dashboard (EPA): DTXSID20932894

Chemical and physical data
- Formula: C_{16}H_{19}Cl_{2}NO_{2}
- Molar mass: 328.23 g·mol^{−1}
- 3D model (JSmol): Interactive image
- SMILES: COC(=O)[C@@H]1[C@H]2CC[C@H](N2C)C[C@@H]1C3=CC(=C(C=C3)Cl)Cl
- InChI: InChI=1S/C16H19Cl2NO2/c1-19-10-4-6-14(19)15(16(20)21-2)11(8-10)9-3-5-12(17)13(18)7-9/h3,5,7,10-11,14-15H,4,6,8H2,1-2H3/t10-,11+,14+,15-/m0/s1; Key:JFUNLJPTPCQLIR-PJQZNRQZSA-N

Dichloropane ((−)-2β-Carbomethoxy-3β-(3,4-dichlorophenyl)tropane, RTI-111, O-401) is a stimulant of the phenyltropane class that acts as a serotonin–norepinephrine–dopamine reuptake inhibitor (SNDRI) with IC_{50} values of 3.13, 18, and 0.79 nM, respectively. In animal studies, dichloropane had a slower onset and longer duration of action compared to cocaine. It has been reported as a designer drug, first identified in 2016 in both Sweden and Slovenia.

Methylecgonidine is the direct precursor to this compound.

== Trans -CO_{2}Me group ==
The thermodynamic isomer with a trans -CO_{2}Me group is still active. This isomer was used by Neurosearch to make three different phenyltropanes which were tested in clinical trials.

- Tesofensine
- Brasofensine
- NS-2359 (GSK-372,475)

== See also ==
- 3,4-DCMP
- O-2390
- List of cocaine analogues
- List of phenyltropanes
