= C11H11Cl2N =

The molecular formula C_{11}H_{11}Cl_{2}N (molar mass: 228.118 g/mol, exact mass: 227.0269 u) may refer to:

- Amitifadine
- DOV-102,677
- DOV-216,303
