= Centanafadine =

Serotonin-norepinephrine-dopamine reuptake inhibitor

- Molecular structure of centanafadine

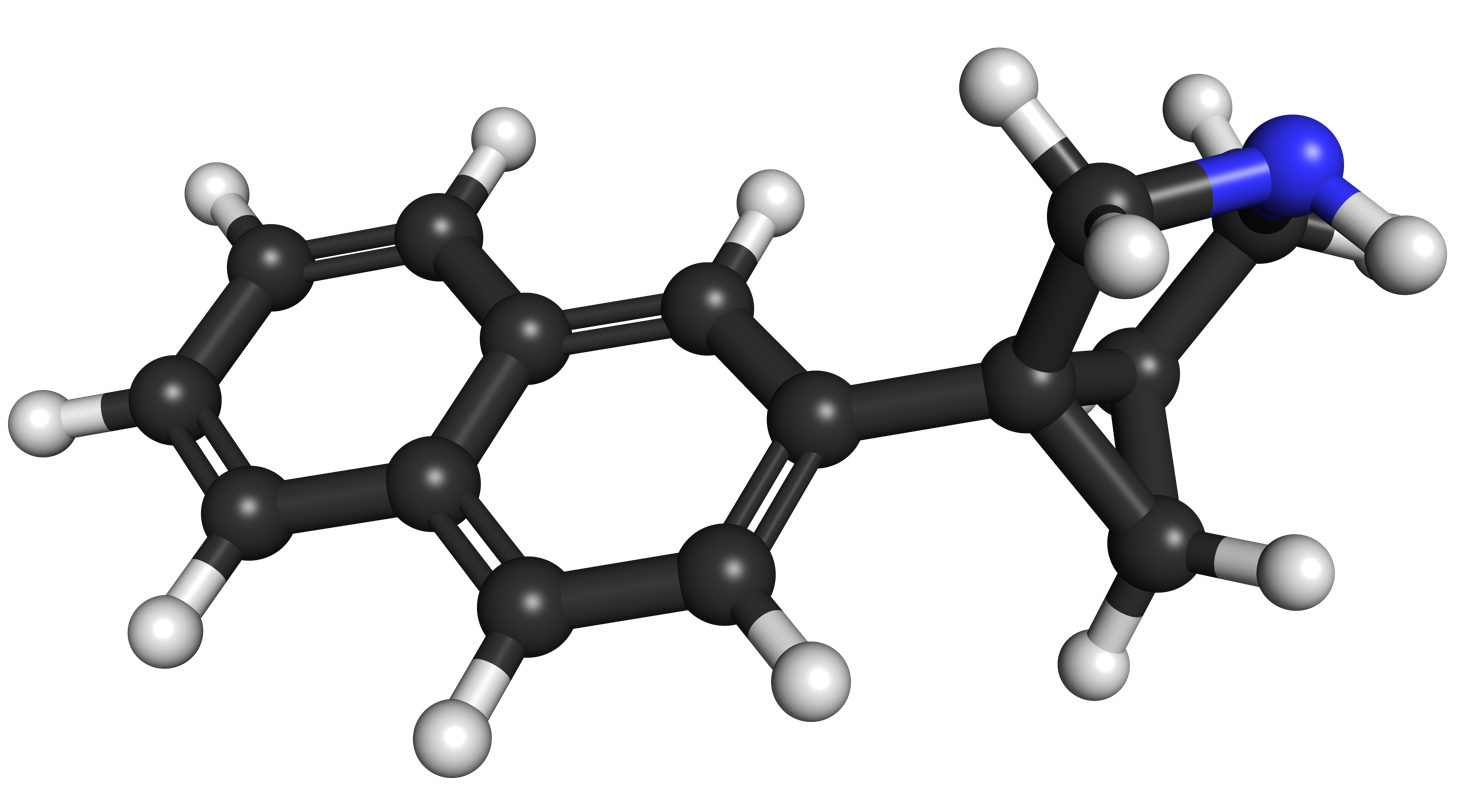
- 3D representation of a centanafadine molecule

Clinical data
- Pronunciation: sen-tan-af-a-deen
- Trade names: Simtriyo
- Other names: CTN; EB-1020; EB1020; EB-1020-SR; DOV-216,419; DOV-216419; DOV216419
- AHFS/Drugs.com: Simtriyo
- License data: US DailyMed: Centanafadine
- Routes of administration: Oral
- Drug class: Serotonin–norepinephrine–dopamine reuptake inhibitor (SNDRI); Stimulant
- ATC code: None

Legal status
- Legal status: US: Schedule III

Pharmacokinetic data
- Protein binding: >99%
- Metabolism: Monoamine oxidase A (MAO-A)
- Elimination half-life: 5.2 hours
- Excretion: Urine: 88% Feces: 7%

Identifiers
- IUPAC name: (1R,5S)-1-naphthalen-2-yl-3-azabicyclo[3.1.0]hexane
- CAS Number: 924012-43-1
- PubChem CID: 16095349
- DrugBank: DB14841
- ChemSpider: 17253639
- UNII: D2A6T4UH9C
- KEGG: D10697
- ChEBI: CHEBI:747899
- ChEMBL: ChEMBL3301621
- CompTox Dashboard (EPA): DTXSID201045788

Chemical and physical data
- Formula: C_{15}H_{15}N
- Molar mass: 209.292 g·mol^{−1}
- 3D model (JSmol): Interactive image
- SMILES: C1[C@H]2[C@@]1(CNC2)C3=CC4=CC=CC=C4C=C3
- InChI: InChI=1S/C15H15N/c1-2-4-12-7-13(6-5-11(12)3-1)15-8-14(15)9-16-10-15/h1-7,14,16H,8-10H2/t14-,15+/m1/s1; Key:HKHCSWPSUSWGLI-CABCVRRESA-N

Centanafadine, sold under the brand name Simtriyo, is a medication used for the treatment of attention deficit hyperactivity disorder (ADHD). It is taken orally.

Common side effects of centanafadine include headache, appetite loss, insomnia, nausea, dry mouth, abdominal pain, and rash, among others. It carries a boxed warning for suicidal ideation and behaviors in children and adolescents aged six years and older, as well as for potential abuse, misuse, and addiction. The drug is a serotonin–norepinephrine–dopamine reuptake inhibitor (SNDRI), with preference for norepinephrine and then dopamine over serotonin, and has stimulant effects.

Centanafadine was approved for medical use in the United States in July 2026. On October 30, 2026, the Drug Enforcement Administration issued an interim final rule on the Federal Register to classify centanafadine as Schedule III.

== Medical uses ==
In the United States, centanafadine is indicated for the treatment of attention deficit hyperactivity disorder (ADHD) in adults and children aged six years and older who weigh at least 20 kg (44 lb). Use is not recommended in children younger than six years, as a higher incidence of weight loss was observed, or in those weighing less than 20 kg (44 lb), as data is lacking.

=== Available forms ===
Centanafadine is so far only available in the form of extended-release oral capsules in 140 mg, 210 mg, and 280 mg doses.

== Contraindications ==
Contraindications of centanafadine include hypersensitivity to centanafadine or its excipients, concomitant use within 14 days of taking or stopping a monoamine oxidase inhibitor (MAOI), and history of pheochromocytoma.

== Side effects ==
Side effects of centanafadine include decreased appetite, nausea, rash, abdominal pain, fatigue, insomnia, dry mouth, diarrhea, irritability, elevated mood, and euphoria, among others.

Centanafadine carries a boxed warning for suicidal ideation and behaviors in pediatric patients aged six years and older. In a double-blind randomized controlled trial with reported results for children aged 6 to 12 years old, suicide attempts were reported in 0.7% (2/304) of patients treated with centanafadine, compared with 0% (0/153) in the placebo group. In a separate long-term open-label trial with patients aged 6 to 17 years old, suicidal ideation was reported in 0.8% (5/620) of patients, which led to discontinuation of treatment for 0.6% (4/620) of them.

== Overdose ==
There is limited experience with overdose of centanafadine. In clinical trials, centanafadine overdose resulted in symptoms including vomiting, tachypnea, tachycardia, and elevated blood pressure. Treatment of centanafadine overdose should be supportive and based on symptoms.

== Interactions ==
Centanafadine is primarily metabolized by monoamine oxidase A (MAO-A) and hence should not be taken in combination with monoamine oxidase inhibitors (MAOIs).

== Pharmacology ==
=== Pharmacodynamics ===
Centanafadine is a stimulant and acts as a serotonin–norepinephrine–dopamine reuptake inhibitor (SNDRI). Its IC_{50} values for monoamine reuptake inhibition have been reported to be 6 nM for norepinephrine, 38 nM for dopamine, and 83 nM for serotonin. Hence, the drug shows 6.3-fold preference for inhibition of norepinephrine reuptake over dopamine reuptake, 13.8-fold preference for inhibition of norepinephrine reuptake over serotonin reuptake, and 2.2-fold preference for inhibition of dopamine reuptake over serotonin reuptake.

Activities
Site	IC_{50} (nM)	Action	Ref
SERT	83 nM	Inhibitor	
NET	6 nM	Inhibitor	
DAT	38 nM	Inhibitor	

=== Pharmacokinetics ===
Centanafadine is primarily metabolized by monoamine oxidase A (MAO-A). The elimination half-life of centanafadine is 5.2 hours.

== Chemistry ==
Centanafadine is a substituted naphthylethylamine and cyclized phenethylamine.

=== Analogues ===
Some structurally related compounds to centanafadine include various compounds containing a naphthyl aromatic ring joined to an aminoalkyl group such as naphthylaminopropane (PAL-287), naphthylmorpholine (PAL-678), methylnaphthidate (HDMP-28), 1-(2-naphthyl)piperazine (2-NP; 1-deazaquipazine) and WF-23, as well as other substituted 3-azabicyclo[3.1.0]hexanes such as bicifadine, amitifadine and DOV-216,303.

== History ==
Centanafadine's development began with Euthymics Bioscience after it acquired DOV Pharmaceutical. It was developed as a treatment for attention deficit hyperactivity disorder (ADHD). In 2011, Euthymics Bioscience spun off its development of centanafadine to a new company called Neurovance. In March 2017, Otsuka Pharmaceutical acquired Neurovance and the rights to centanafadine. Centanafadine was approved for medical use in the United States in July 2026.

== Society and culture ==
=== Names ===
Centanafadine is the generic name of the drug and its International Nonproprietary Name (INN) and United States Adopted Name (USAN). It is also known by its former developmental code names EB-1020 and DOV-216419 and is sold under the brand name Simtriyo.

=== Legal status ===
Centanafadine was approved for medical use in the United States in July 2026. Centanafadine shows misuse liability similar to that of amphetamine in humans. On October 30, 2026, the Drug Enforcement Administration issued an interim final order to put centanafadine into Schedule III as a Stimulant with the ACSCN 1641.

== Research ==
In addition to its approved indication of attention deficit hyperactivity disorder (ADHD), centanafadine is under development for the treatment of anxiety disorders, major depressive disorder, and smoking withdrawal. As of June 2026, it is in phase 3 clinical trials for anxiety disorders and is in phase 2 trials for major depressive disorder and smoking withdrawal. The drug was also under development for the treatment of binge eating disorder and neuropathic pain, but development for these indications was discontinued.
