= C14H17Cl2NO =

The molecular formula C_{14}H_{17}Cl_{2}NO (molar mass: 286.2 g/mol; exact mass: 285.06872 u) may refer to:

- Cendifensine
- GSK1360707F
