= Diclofensine =

Chemical compound

Clinical data
- ATC code: None

Legal status
- Legal status: In general: legal

Identifiers
- IUPAC name: 4-(3,4-dichlorophenyl)-7-methoxy-2-methyl-1,2,3,4-tetrahydroisoquinoline
- CAS Number: 67165-56-4
- PubChem CID: 68871
- ChemSpider: 62103
- UNII: 09HKW863J6
- ChEMBL: ChEMBL287257
- CompTox Dashboard (EPA): DTXSID30867264

Chemical and physical data
- Formula: C_{17}H_{17}Cl_{2}NO
- Molar mass: 322.23 g·mol^{−1}
- 3D model (JSmol): Interactive image
- SMILES: CN1CC(C2=C(C1)C=C(C=C2)OC)C3=CC(=C(C=C3)Cl)Cl
- InChI: InChI=1S/C17H17Cl2NO/c1-20-9-12-7-13(21-2)4-5-14(12)15(10-20)11-3-6-16(18)17(19)8-11/h3-8,15H,9-10H2,1-2H3; Key:ZJDCGVDEEHWEIG-UHFFFAOYSA-N

Diclofensine (Ro 8-4650) was developed by Hoffmann-La Roche in the 1970s in the search for a new antidepressant. It was found that the (S)-isomer was responsible for activity. Diclofensine is a stimulant drug which acts as a triple monoamine reuptake inhibitor, primarily inhibiting the reuptake of dopamine and norepinephrine, with affinities (K_{i}) of 16.8 nM, 15.7 nM, and 51 nM for DAT, NET, and SERT (dopamine, norepinephrine and serotonin transporters), respectively. It was found to be an effective antidepressant in human trials, with relatively few side effects, but was ultimately dropped from clinical development, possibly due to concerns about its abuse potential.

Diclofensine is chemically a tetrahydroisoquinoline (THIQ) derivative, as is nomifensine.

== Synthesis ==
Patents: Also:

The condensation of m-anisaldehyde [591-31-1] (1) with methylamine gives N-methyl-3-methoxybenzenemethanimine [16928-30-6]. Reduction of this Schiff-base intermediate with sodium borohydride gives (3-methoxybenzyl)methylamine [41789-95-1] (2). Alkylation of this with 3,4-dichlorophenacylbromide [2632-10-2] (3) would give CID:59580342 (4). Reduction of the benzoyl ketone with sodium borohydride gives the alcohol [802051-24-7] (5). Acid catalyzed intramolecular cyclization then completes the synthesis of the 4-aryl-THIQ derivative, diclofensine (6).

== See also ==
- Brasofensine
- McN-4612
- Sertraline
- Tesofensine
