= BTS 74,398 =

Chemical compound

Identifiers
- IUPAC name: 1-([1-(3,4-dichlorophenyl)cyclobutyl]-2-(3-diaminethylaminopropylthio)ethanone
- CAS Number: 548491-50-5
- PubChem CID: 24838024
- ChemSpider: 26325181
- UNII: I3W0WCC63A
- CompTox Dashboard (EPA): DTXSID801027130

Chemical and physical data
- Formula: C_{19}H_{29}Cl_{2}N_{3}OS
- Molar mass: 418.42 g·mol^{−1}
- 3D model (JSmol): Interactive image; Interactive image
- SMILES: NCCN(CCN)CCCSCC(=O)C2(CCC2)c(cc1Cl)ccc1Cl; c1cc(c(cc1C2(CCC2)C(=O)CSCCCN(CCN)CCN)Cl)Cl
- InChI: InChI=1S/C19H29Cl2N3OS/c20-16-4-3-15(13-17(16)21)19(5-1-6-19)18(25)14-26-12-2-9-24(10-7-22)11-8-23/h3-4,13H,1-2,5-12,14,22-23H2; Key:OLQJWCYRPYGTJI-UHFFFAOYSA-N

BTS 74,398 is a centrally acting stimulant drug which was developed for the treatment of Parkinson's disease. It inhibits the synaptic reuptake of dopamine, serotonin and noradrenaline, making it a triple reuptake inhibitor. It was effective in animal models of Parkinson's disease, but was unsuccessful in human trials.
