= Nomifensine =

Withdrawn antidepressant medication

- Skeletal structure of nomifensine

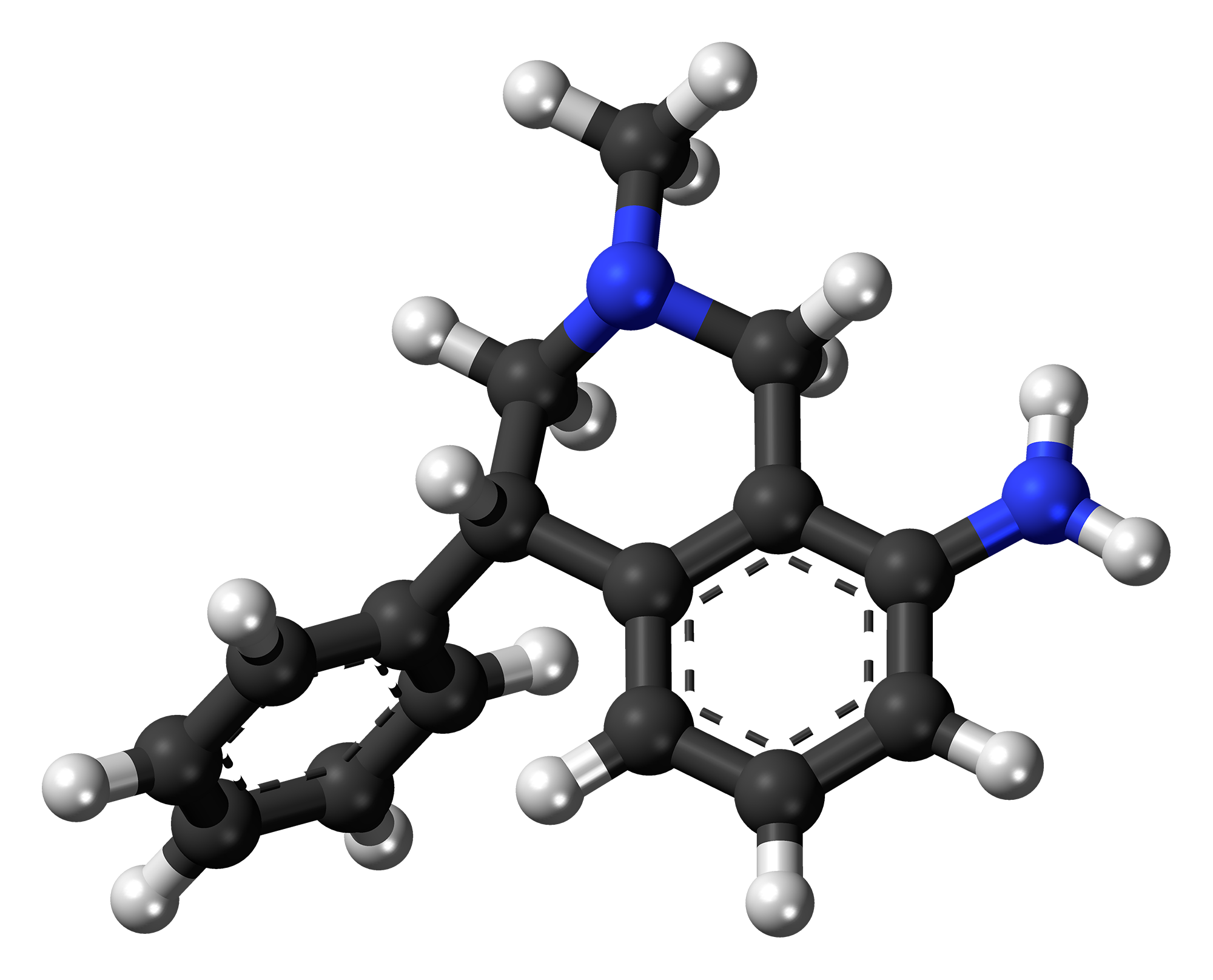
- 3D representation of a nomifensine molecule

Clinical data
- Trade names: Merital, Alival
- Routes of administration: By mouth
- ATC code: N06AX04 (WHO)

Legal status
- Legal status: BR: Class C1 (Other controlled substances); Withdrawn

Pharmacokinetic data
- Elimination half-life: 1.5–4 hours
- Excretion: Kidney (88%) within 24 hours

Identifiers
- IUPAC name: (±)-2-Methyl-4-phenyl-1,2,3,4-tetrahydroisoquinolin-8-amine
- CAS Number: 24526-64-5
- PubChem CID: 4528
- IUPHAR/BPS: 4792
- DrugBank: DB04821
- ChemSpider: 4371
- UNII: 1LGS5JRP31
- KEGG: D05200
- ChEBI: CHEBI:116225
- ChEMBL: ChEMBL273575
- CompTox Dashboard (EPA): DTXSID0023377

Chemical and physical data
- Formula: C_{16}H_{18}N_{2}
- Molar mass: 238.334 g·mol^{−1}
- 3D model (JSmol): Interactive image
- SMILES: CN1Cc2c(N)cccc2C(c2ccccc2)C1
- InChI: InChI=1S/C16H18N2/c1-18-10-14(12-6-3-2-4-7-12)13-8-5-9-16(17)15(13)11-18/h2-9,14H,10-11,17H2,1H3; Key:XXPANQJNYNUNES-UHFFFAOYSA-N

Nomifensine, formerly sold under the brand names Merital and Alival, is a norepinephrine–dopamine reuptake inhibitor (NDRI) drug that was developed in the 1960s by Hoechst AG (now Sanofi-Aventis), who then test marketed it in the United States.

Nomifensine was considered an effective antidepressant that lacked sedative effects. It did not interact significantly with alcohol and lacked anticholinergic effects. No withdrawal symptoms were seen after 6 months treatment. The drug was, however, considered not suitable for agitated patients as it presumably made agitation worse. In January 1986 the drug was withdrawn by its manufacturers for safety reasons.

Some case reports in the 1980s suggested that there was potential for psychological dependence on nomifensine, typically in patients with a history of stimulant addiction, or when the drug was used in very high doses (400–600 mg per day).

In a 1989 study it was investigated for use in treating attention deficit hyperactivity disorder (ADHD) in adults and was proven to be effective. In a 1977 study it was not proven of benefit in advanced parkinsonism, except for depression associated with the parkinsonism.

== Medical uses ==
Nomifensine was investigated for use as an antidepressant in the 1970s, and was found to be a useful antidepressant at doses of 50–225 mg per day, both motivating and anxiolytic.

== Adverse effects ==
During treatment with nomifensine there were relatively few adverse effects, mainly renal failure, paranoid symptoms, drowsiness or insomnia, headache, and dry mouth. Side effects affecting the cardiovascular system included tachycardia and palpitations, but nomifensine was significantly less cardiotoxic than the standard tricyclic antidepressants.

=== Withdrawal from market ===
Due to a risk of haemolytic anaemia, the U.S. Food and Drug Administration (FDA) withdrew approval for nomifensine on March 20, 1992. Nomifensine was subsequently withdrawn from the Canadian and UK markets as well. Some deaths were linked to immunohaemolytic anemia caused by this compound, although the mechanism remained unclear.

== Synthesis ==
Nomifensine was a progenitor to Gastrophenzine. See also: Isatin derivatives.

Thieme Synthesis: Radiolabelled:; Improved method:; Analogs: Enantiomers:

The alkylation between N-methyl-2-nitrobenzylamine [56222-08-3] (1) and phenacyl bromide (2) gives CID:15326127 (3). Catalytic hydrogenation over Raney Nickel reduces the nitro group to give CID:15113381 (4). The reduction of the ketone group with sodium borohydride to alcohol gives [65514-97-8] (5). Acid catalysed ring closure completes the formation of nomifensine (6).

== Research ==
=== Motivational disorders ===
Nomifensine has been found to reverse tetrabenazine-induced motivational deficits in animals. It shares these pro-motivational effects with other NDRIs like bupropion and methylphenidate and with selective dopamine reuptake inhibitors like modafinil and its analogues. Conversely, selective norepinephrine reuptake inhibitors like desipramine and atomoxetine and selective serotonin reuptake inhibitors like fluoxetine and citalopram have not shown pro-motivational effects in animals.

=== Wakefulness ===
Nomifensine shows wakefulness-promoting effects in animals and might be useful in the treatment of narcolepsy.

== See also ==
- Amineptine
- Diclofensine
- Perafensine
- Tesofensine
- The combination of Clobazam / nomifensine is called Psyton [75963-47-2].
