= GSK1360707F =

Chemical compound

Identifiers
- IUPAC name: (1R,6S)-1-(3,4-Dichlorophenyl)-6-(methoxymethyl)-4-azabicyclo[4.1.0]heptane
- CAS Number: 1013098-04-8
- PubChem CID: 24802841
- ChemSpider: 32739425
- UNII: 9DE44WJ46X
- CompTox Dashboard (EPA): DTXSID601029661

Chemical and physical data
- Formula: C_{14}H_{17}Cl_{2}NO
- Molar mass: 286.20 g·mol^{−1}
- 3D model (JSmol): Interactive image
- SMILES: COC[C@@]12C[C@@]1(CCNC2)c3ccc(c(c3)Cl)Cl
- InChI: InChI=1S/C14H17Cl2NO/c1-18-9-13-7-14(13,4-5-17-8-13)10-2-3-11(15)12(16)6-10/h2-3,6,17H,4-5,7-9H2,1H3/t13-,14-/m0/s1; Key:ICXJGCSEMJXNQF-KBPBESRZSA-N

GSK1360707F is a potent and selective triple reuptake inhibitor. It is chemically related to amitifadine and NS-2359 (GSK-372,475). Until recently, it was under development for the treatment of major depressive disorder; its development was put on hold for strategic reasons.

== Synthesis ==
Synthesis of GSK1360707F

1. BOC Protecting group.
2. Enolization and trapping with triflate group (cf Comins' reagent).
3. Suzuki reaction
4. Reduction (only 1 mol eq. LAH because N-BOC can be reduced to N-Me)
5. Trifluoroacetic acid (TFA) removal of protecting group.
6. Simmons–Smith reaction cyclopropanation.
7. Williamson ether synthesis (c.f. NS patents & paxil).

== Transporter occupancy ==
GSK1360707F has recently (2013) been tested on baboons (Papio anubis) & humans for transporter occupancy using PET.

== See also ==
- NS-2359
