= C14H21N =

The molecular formula C_{14}H_{21}N (molar mass: 203.32 g/mol; exact mass: 203.167399 u) may refer to:

- Eticyclidine
- M.G. 6669
