= C20H23N3 =

The molecular formula C_{20}H_{23}N_{3} (molar mass: 305.42 g/mol, exact mass: 305.1892 u) may refer to:

- Cianopramine, or 3-cyanoimipramine
- Fezolamine (Win-41,528-2)
- LEK-8829
