= Perafensine =

Chemical compound

Clinical data
- Other names: HR-459
- ATC code: None

Legal status
- Legal status: Abandoned

Identifiers
- IUPAC name: 1-phenyl-3-(1-piperazinyl)isoquinoline
- CAS Number: 72444-62-3
- PubChem CID: 3047830
- ChemSpider: 2310140
- UNII: WU6989IN6X
- CompTox Dashboard (EPA): DTXSID40222744

Chemical and physical data
- Formula: C_{19}H_{19}N_{3}
- Molar mass: 289.382 g·mol^{−1}
- 3D model (JSmol): Interactive image
- SMILES: c1ccc(cc1)c2c3ccccc3cc(n2)N4CCNCC4
- InChI: InChI=1S/C19H19N3/c1-2-6-15(7-3-1)19-17-9-5-4-8-16(17)14-18(21-19)22-12-10-20-11-13-22/h1-9,14,20H,10-13H2; Key:BHHDTFRLKOTSKW-UHFFFAOYSA-N

Perafensine (INN; development code HR-459) is a drug which was investigated as an antidepressant but was never marketed. It has been reported to antagonize the effects of reserpine and to inhibit the reuptake of norepinephrine (norepinephrine reuptake inhibitor); whether it also affects the reuptake of serotonin or dopamine is unclear.

== See also ==
- Diclofensine
- Nomifensine
