= C18H19NO =

The molecular formula C_{18}H_{19}NO (molar mass: 265.356 g/mol) may refer to:

- Nordoxepin
- HP-505
