= C25H27NO2 =

The molecular formula C_{25}H_{27}NO_{2} (molar mass: 373.486 g/mol) may refer to:

- D-161
- Endoxifen
