= U-32,802A =

Butyrophenone neuroleptic

Identifiers
- IUPAC name: 1-(4-fluorophenyl)-4-[[4-(4-fluorophenyl)cyclohex-3-en-1-yl]amino]butan-1-one
- CAS Number: 36735-48-5
- PubChem CID: hydrochloride: 193243
- ChemSpider: hydrochloride: 167691

Chemical and physical data
- Formula: C_{22}H_{23}F_{2}NO
- Molar mass: 355.429 g·mol^{−1}
- 3D model (JSmol): Interactive image; hydrochloride: Interactive image
- SMILES: C1CC(=CCC1NCCCC(=O)C2=CC=C(C=C2)F)C3=CC=C(C=C3)F; hydrochloride: C1CC(=CCC1NCCCC(=O)C2=CC=C(C=C2)F)C3=CC=C(C=C3)F.Cl
- InChI: InChI=1S/C22H23F2NO/c23-19-9-3-16(4-10-19)17-7-13-21(14-8-17)25-15-1-2-22(26)18-5-11-20(24)12-6-18/h3-7,9-12,21,25H,1-2,8,13-15H2; Key:YPJKDDHCJRLZIW-UHFFFAOYSA-N; hydrochloride: InChI=1S/C22H23F2NO.ClH/c23-19-9-3-16(4-10-19)17-7-13-21(14-8-17)25-15-1-2-22(26)18-5-11-20(24)12-6-18;/h3-7,9-12,21,25H,1-2,8,13-15H2;1H; Key:HWSBEFRRYZIENO-UHFFFAOYSA-N

U-32,802A is an antipsychotic tranquilizer of the butyrophenone class. It was developed by Daniel Lednicer at Upjohn Pharmaceuticals in the early part of the 1970s. Whereas related agents are based on a 4-aryl-piperidine central ring system, U-32,802A is an 4-aryl-cyclohexylamine, which might be expected to offer a unique pharmacological profile. Based on the available pharmacological data, U-32,802A was hypothesized to act primarily at the presynaptic organelles for storage of monoamines in a way similar to tetrabenazine.

== Analogs ==
U-35,777A

=== Cyclohexylamine butyrophenones ===
A large number of cyclohexylamine butyrophenones was reported by Lednicer et al.:

1. U-35,777A HCl salt: [55199-71-8] Patent:
2. PC12251406
3. PC83261250 4-(2-Methoxyphenyl)cyclohex-3-en-1-amine,
4. PC37529
5. Benzospirans:
6. 2-amino-5-phenylbicyclo[3.3.1]nonanes
7. PC12230284

=== 4-Arylcyclohexylamines ===
All four of these designs are also antipsychotics, but they differ in that they were patented by companys other than for Lednicer and employ a different variety of sidechain than was seen above for the butyrophenones. Interestingly, although PC15079631 was listed as an antipsychotic, its mode of auction was to augment dopaminergic neurotransmission and not to inhibit it. This paradoxical mode of antipsychotic action was likewise reported for PD137789 & for PD-158771

1. Pramiverine is an antispasmodic.
2. SIR 117 [41695-51-6] is an antidepressant.
- SAR simplification in the molecular structure of EXP-561 leads to a compound called 4-Phenylcyclohexylamine [19992-45-1].
