= Cendifensine =

Clinical data
- Other names: NOE-115
- Drug class: Monoamine reuptake inhibitor

Identifiers
- IUPAC name: (3,4-dichlorophenyl)-[(3S)-3-propylpyrrolidin-3-yl]methanone
- CAS Number: 1034048-49-1
- PubChem CID: 59744668
- ChemSpider: 42806369
- UNII: N4U2JR8GCX

Chemical and physical data
- Formula: C_{14}H_{17}Cl_{2}NO
- Molar mass: 286.20 g·mol^{−1}
- 3D model (JSmol): Interactive image
- SMILES: CCC[C@@]1(CCNC1)C(=O)C2=CC(=C(C=C2)Cl)Cl
- InChI: InChI=1S/C14H17Cl2NO/c1-2-5-14(6-7-17-9-14)13(18)10-3-4-11(15)12(16)8-10/h3-4,8,17H,2,5-7,9H2,1H3/t14-/m0/s1; Key:HVLPRTLORBIKNG-AWEZNQCLSA-N

Cendifensine (INN) is a monoamine reuptake inhibitor (MRI) related to the amphetamines and cathinones which has not been marketed at this time. It was first described by 2013 and its INN was proposed in 2024. The drug has been patented by Noema Pharma, which is developing a serotonin–norepinephrine–dopamine reuptake inhibitor (SNDRI) known as NOE-115 for the treatment of vasomotor symptoms associated with menopause as well as for binge-eating disorder and depressive disorders.

== See also ==
- 3,4-Dichloroamphetamine
- Bupropion
- Lafadofensine
- Org 6582
