= Nefopam =

Analgesic medication

Clinical data
- Trade names: nefopam medisol
- AHFS/Drugs.com: International Drug Names
- License data: US DailyMed: Nefopam
- Routes of administration: intramuscular, intravenous, oral
- Drug class: Serotonin-norepinephrine-dopamine reuptake inhibitor; analgesic
- ATC code: N02BG06 (WHO)

Legal status
- Legal status: AU: S4 (Prescription only); UK: POM (Prescription only)

Pharmacokinetic data
- Bioavailability: Low
- Protein binding: 70–75% (mean 73%)
- Metabolism: Liver (N-demethylation, others)
- Metabolites: Desmethylnefopam, others
- Elimination half-life: Nefopam: 3–8 hours Desmethylnefopam: 10–15 hours
- Excretion: Urine: 79.3% Feces: 13.4%

Identifiers
- IUPAC name: (RS)-5-methyl-1-phenyl-1,3,4,6-tetrahydro-2,5-benzoxazocine
- CAS Number: 13669-70-0
- PubChem CID: 4450
- DrugBank: DB12293
- ChemSpider: 4295
- UNII: 4UP8060B7J
- KEGG: D08258
- ChEBI: CHEBI:88316
- CompTox Dashboard (EPA): DTXSID2048535
- ECHA InfoCard: 100.033.757

Chemical and physical data
- Formula: C_{17}H_{19}NO
- Molar mass: 253.345 g·mol^{−1}
- 3D model (JSmol): Interactive image
- SMILES: CN1CCOC(C2=CC=CC=C2C1)C3=CC=CC=C3
- InChI: InChI=1S/C17H19NO/c1-18-11-12-19-17(14-7-3-2-4-8-14)16-10-6-5-9-15(16)13-18/h2-10,17H,11-13H2,1H3; Key:RGPDEAGGEXEMMM-UHFFFAOYSA-N

Nefopam, sold under the brand name Acupan among others, is a centrally acting, non-opioid analgesic medication, with stimulant and sympathomimetic properties that is primarily used to treat moderate to severe pain.

== History ==
Nefopam is based on a benzoxazocine compound. It was developed in the 1960s and marketed under the name fenazocine. It was initially used in shivering, as a muscle relaxant and as an antidepressant, but then increasingly as an analgesic.

== Medical uses ==
=== Analgesic ===
Nefopam was significantly more effective than aspirin as an analgesic in one clinical trial, although with a greater incidence of side effects such as sweating, dizziness and nausea, especially at higher doses.

The estimated relative potency of nefopam to morphine indicates that 20 mg of nefopam HCl is the approximate analgesic equal of 12 mg of morphine with comparable analgesic efficacy to morphine, or oxycodone. Nefopam tends to produce fewer side effects, does not produce respiratory depression, and has much less abuse potential, and so is useful either as an alternative to opioid analgesics, or as an adjunctive treatment for use alongside opioids or other types of analgesics.

==== Postoperative pain ====
A 2025 review, covering 17 studies, found that nefopam was an effective adjunctive postoperative analgesic with benefits in pain management, and correlated with a mean decrease in opioid consumption across the studies of 38%. Adverse effects were not discussed in detail in the included studies.

==== Chronic pain ====
For chronic pain nefopam may sometimes be used when common alternatives are contraindicated or ineffective, or as an add-on therapy.

=== Other medical uses ===
Nefopam is used to treat severe hiccups.

Nefopam is thought to have some efficacy for treating (off-label) Parkinson's disease, in a similar fashion to those of Bupropion and Methylphenidate.

Nefopam is effective for prevention of shivering during surgery or recovery from surgery.

=== Dosage ===
Dosage is normally 90-180mg per day. Maximum dose is regarded as 270mg/day. One 1979 study found that a ceiling effect on post-operative pain relief occurred at 60mg/day.

== Contraindications ==
Nefopam is contraindicated in people with convulsive disorders, those that have received treatment with irreversible monoamine oxidase inhibitors such as phenelzine, tranylcypromine or isocarboxazid within the past 30 days and those with myocardial infarction pain, mostly due to a lack of safety data in these conditions.

== Side effects ==
Common side effects include nausea, nervousness, dry mouth, light-headedness and urinary retention. Less common side effects include vomiting, blurred vision, drowsiness, sweating, insomnia, headache, confusion, hallucinations, tachycardia, aggravation of angina and rarely a temporary and benign pink discolouration of the skin or erythema multiforme.

=== CNS side effects ===
Some side effects, such as feeling confused or hallucinating, are more likely in patients over 65 years old.

Nefopam has been shown to have anticholinergic properties and has a score of 2 on the anticholinergic burden (ACB) scale.Anticholinergic drugs have caused concerns about cognitive decline in older people.

=== Overdose ===
Overdose and death have been reported with nefopam. Overdose usually manifests with convulsions, hallucinations, tachycardia, and hyperdynamic circulation. Treatment is usually supportive, managing cardiovascular complications with beta blockers and limiting absorption with activated charcoal.

== Interactions ==
Nefopam has additive anticholinergic and sympathomimetic effects with other agents with these properties. Its use should be avoided in people receiving some types of antidepressants (tricyclic antidepressants or monoamine oxidase inhibitors) as there is the potential for serotonin syndrome or hypertensive crises to result.

== Mechanisms of action ==
The mechanism of action of nefopam and its analgesic effects are not well understood.

=== Analgesic mechanisms of action ===
Nefopam may have three analgesic mechanisms in the brain and spinal cord;

- antinociceptive pain modulation effects by triple neurotransmitter reuptake inhibition of serotonin, norepinephrine, and dopamine (that is, acting as an SNDRI).
- antihyperalgesic activity through modulation of glutamatergic transmission via modulating sodium and calcium channels.
- inhibition of long-term potentiation mediated by NMDA from the inhibition of calcium influx.

== Pharmacology ==
A 2025 review noted a significant literature gap on the pharmacokinetic and pharmacodynamic properties of nefopam.

Nefopam
Site	K_{i} (nM)
SERT	29
NET	33
DAT	531
5-HT_{2A}	1,685
5-HT_{2B}	330
5-HT_{2C}	56

=== Pharmacokinetics ===
The absolute bioavailability of nefopam is low. It is reported to achieve therapeutic plasma concentrations between 49 and 183 nM. The drug is approximately 73% protein-bound across a plasma range of 7 to 226 ng/mL (28–892 nM). The metabolism of nefopam is hepatic, by N-demethylation and via other routes. Its terminal half-life is 3 to 8 hours, while that of its active metabolite, desmethylnefopam, is 10 to 15 hours. It is eliminated mostly in urine, and to a lesser extent in feces.

== Chemistry ==
Nefopam is a cyclized analogue of orphenadrine, diphenhydramine, and tofenacin, with each of these compounds different from one another only by the presence of one or two carbons. The ring system of nefopam is a benzoxazocine system.

== Manufacture ==
A 2025 review highlighted the difficulties and environmental costs of current Nefopam manufacturing processes, but the potential for improvement.

== Use by country ==
Nefopam is used in the UK, under prescription only, although some UK regions do not advise initiation of use. It is used in France, although some concerns have been raised, due to it being misused, as it was used orally instead of intravenously.. An oral form is now commercialized in France, as to lessen the misuse of the intravenous form.

As of 2014 Nefopam was not FDA-approved in the US.

== Society and culture ==
=== Recreational use ===
Recreational use of nefopam has rarely been reported, and is far less common than with opioid analgesics.

== See also ==
- Troparil
