= Toludesvenlafaxine =

SNDRI antidepressant drug

Clinical data
- Other names: LY03005; LPM570065; 4-Methylbenzoate desvenlafaxine
- Routes of administration: By mouth

Identifiers
- IUPAC name: 4-[2-(Dimethylamino)-1-(1-hydroxycyclohexyl)ethyl]phenyl 4-methylbenzoate
- CAS Number: 916918-84-8 (hydrochloride)
- PubChem CID: 56955395
- ChemSpider: 13114670
- UNII: V6Z6K3OQX4

Chemical and physical data
- Formula: C_{24}H_{31}NO_{3}
- Molar mass: 381.516 g·mol^{−1}
- 3D model (JSmol): Interactive image
- SMILES: Cc1ccc(cc1)C(=O)Oc2ccc(cc2)C(CN(C)C)C3(CCCCC3)O
- InChI: InChI=1S/C24H31NO3/c1-18-7-9-20(10-8-18)23(26)28-21-13-11-19(12-14-21)22(17-25(2)3)24(27)15-5-4-6-16-24/h7-14,22,27H,4-6,15-17H2,1-3H3; Key:QKYBZJLEMOZFFU-UHFFFAOYSA-N

Toludesvenlafaxine, also formerly known as ansofaxine and sold under the brand name Ruoxinlin, is an antidepressant which is approved for the treatment of major depressive disorder in China. It is also under development for use in other countries like the United States. It is a serotonin–norepinephrine–dopamine reuptake inhibitor (SNDRI) and was developed by Luye Pharma Group.

Toludesvenlafaxine is described as an SNDRI and prodrug to desvenlafaxine. However, unlike desvenlafaxine, which has in vitro IC_{50} values of 53 nM and 538 nM for inhibition of serotonin and norepinephrine reuptake, respectively, toludesvenlafaxine has respective in vitro IC_{50} values of 723 nM, 763 nM, and 491 nM for serotonin, norepinephrine, and dopamine reuptake inhibition. As such, toludesvenlafaxine appears to be a more balanced reuptake inhibitor of serotonin, norepinephrine, and dopamine than desvenlafaxine.

As of July 2018, toludesvenlafaxine is in preregistration for the treatment of depression in the United States, the European Union, and Japan. In March 2020, the United States Food and Drug Administration accepted Luye Pharma's New Drug Application for toludesvenlafaxine. In November 2022, toludesvenlafaxine was approved for the treatment of depression in China under the brand name Ruoxinlin. In July 2025, phase 3 clinical trials for the treatment of generalized anxiety disorder concluded, with results being published in January 2026. Phase 4 clinical trials for major depressive disorder have been registered since May 2024, but have not begun recruiting yet, and is currently noted as being expected to conclude in June 2027.
