= PRC200-SS =

Triple reuptake inhibitor investigated by the Mayo Clinic

Identifiers
- IUPAC name: (1S,2S)-3-(Methylamino)-2-naphthalen-2-yl-1-phenylpropan-1-ol
- CAS Number: 492434-58-9
- PubChem CID: 20631904
- ChemSpider: 19318181
- UNII: V9MLT2S334
- CompTox Dashboard (EPA): DTXSID101028763
- ECHA InfoCard: 100.207.294

Chemical and physical data
- Formula: C_{20}H_{21}NO
- Molar mass: 291.394 g·mol^{−1}
- 3D model (JSmol): Interactive image
- SMILES: O[C@H](c1ccccc1)[C@H](CNC)c2cc3ccccc3cc2
- InChI: InChI=1S/C20H21NO/c1-21-14-19(20(22)16-8-3-2-4-9-16)18-12-11-15-7-5-6-10-17(15)13-18/h2-13,19-22H,14H2,1H3/t19-,20-/m1/s1; Key:RSZGIFQDUIROGN-WOJBJXKFSA-N

PRC200-SS is an experimental drug of the triple reuptake inhibitor class that was investigated by the Mayo Clinic. Preclinical toxicology studies of PRC200-SS in cynomolgus monkeys showed dose proportional kidney toxicity, precluding any further drug development.

== See also ==
- Substituted naphthylethylamine
