= DOV-102,677 =

Chemical compound

Legal status
- Legal status: US: Investigational New Drug

Identifiers
- IUPAC name: (1S,5R)-1-(3,4-dichlorophenyl)-3-azabicyclo[3.1.0]hexane
- CAS Number: 410074-75-8
- PubChem CID: 11637190
- ChemSpider: 9811932
- UNII: NS8NWQ6NF4
- ChEMBL: ChEMBL488638
- CompTox Dashboard (EPA): DTXSID50469820

Chemical and physical data
- Formula: C_{11}H_{11}Cl_{2}N
- Molar mass: 228.12 g·mol^{−1}
- 3D model (JSmol): Interactive image
- SMILES: C1[C@@H]2[C@]1(CNC2)C3=CC(=C(C=C3)Cl)Cl
- InChI: InChI=1S/C11H11Cl2N/c12-9-2-1-7(3-10(9)13)11-4-8(11)5-14-6-11/h1-3,8,14H,4-6H2/t8-,11+/m0/s1; Key:BSMNRYCSBFHEMQ-GZMMTYOYSA-N

DOV-102,677 is a psychoactive drug being developed by Merck and is currently in clinical trials. It is a triple reuptake inhibitor (TRI), or serotonin-norepinephrine-dopamine reuptake inhibitor (SNDRI). It is the (−)-enantiomer of DOV-216,303, and its (+)-enantiomer is DOV-21,947 (amitifadine).

Instead of being developed for depression, DOV-102,677 is being developed for the treatment of alcoholism.

IC_{50} values for the SERT, NET and DAT are 129 nM, 103 nM, and 133 nM.

DOV stereochemistry

Compound	Uptake			Binding		
Compound	5-HT	NE	DA	SERT	NET	DAT
DOV-216,303	14	20	78	190	380	190
Amitifadine	12	23	96	100	260	210
DOV-102,677	130	100	130	740	1000	220

DOV-102,677 (20 mg/kg IP) increased extracellular levels of dopamine and serotonin in the prefrontal cortex to 320% and 280% above baseline 100 min after administration. Dopamine levels were stably increased for the duration (240 min) of the study, but serotonin levels declined to baseline by 200 min after administration. Norepinephrine levels increased linearly to a maximum of 348% at 240 min post-dosing.
