= Lafadofensine =

Experimental antidepressant

Clinical data
- Drug class: Serotonin–norepinephrine–dopamine reuptake inhibitor

Identifiers
- IUPAC name: (3S)-N,N-bis(4-fluorophenyl)pyrrolidin-3-amine
- CAS Number: 914989-90-5 914989-91-6 (fumarate)
- PubChem CID: 15605612
- ChemSpider: 13081085
- UNII: 7HFV4D3KJL
- ChEMBL: ChEMBL5095070

Chemical and physical data
- Formula: C_{16}H_{16}F_{2}N_{2}
- Molar mass: 274.315 g·mol^{−1}
- 3D model (JSmol): Interactive image
- SMILES: C1CNC[C@H]1N(C2=CC=C(C=C2)F)C3=CC=C(C=C3)F
- InChI: InChI=1S/C16H16F2N2/c17-12-1-5-14(6-2-12)20(16-9-10-19-11-16)15-7-3-13(18)4-8-15/h1-8,16,19H,9-11H2/t16-/m0/s1; Key:ZKEVVJGPWXTETN-INIZCTEOSA-N

Lafadofensine (INN), also known as (3S)-N,N-bis(4-fluorophenyl)pyrrolidin-3-amine, is a drug described as an antidepressant which has not been marketed at this time. It is said to act as a serotonin–norepinephrine–dopamine reuptake inhibitor (SNDRI). The drug was first described by 2010 and its INN was proposed by 2021.

== See also ==
- List of investigational antidepressants
- 2-Diphenylmethylpyrrolidine
- Desoxypipradrol
