= Fezolamine =

Chemical compound

Clinical data
- Routes of administration: Oral
- Drug class: Serotonin-norepinephrine-dopamine reuptake inhibitor; Antidepressant
- ATC code: none

Legal status
- Legal status: In general: uncontrolled

Identifiers
- IUPAC name: 3-(3,4-Diphenyl- 1H-pyrazol- 1-yl)- N,N-dimethylpropan- 1-amine
- CAS Number: 80410-36-2
- PubChem CID: 54567
- ChemSpider: 49284
- UNII: 1133E05F6C
- CompTox Dashboard (EPA): DTXSID00230305

Chemical and physical data
- Formula: C_{20}H_{23}N_{3}
- Molar mass: 305.425 g·mol^{−1}
- 3D model (JSmol): Interactive image
- SMILES: n1c(c(cn1CCCN(C)C)c2ccccc2)c3ccccc3

Fezolamine (Win-41,528-2) is a drug which was investigated by Sterling Drug as an antidepressant in the 1980s. The isomeric N,N-dimethyl-4,5-diphenyl-1H-pyrazole-1-propanamine was completely inactive in the primary antidepressant screens.

It acts as a serotonin, norepinephrine, and dopamine reuptake inhibitor, with 3- to 4-fold preference for the former neurotransmitter. It was found to be effective and well tolerated in clinical trials but was never marketed.

Changing the sidechain leads to an agent called ipazilide.

== See also ==
- 3,3-Diphenylcyclobutanamine
