= 3,3-Diphenylcyclobutanamine =

Stimulant drug

Clinical data
- ATC code: none

Legal status
- Legal status: In general: uncontrolled

Identifiers
- IUPAC name: 3,3-diphenylcyclobutan-1-amine
- CAS Number: 64895-45-0
- PubChem CID: 47486
- ChemSpider: 43204
- UNII: CN43PDA78X
- CompTox Dashboard (EPA): DTXSID701029414

Chemical and physical data
- Formula: C_{16}H_{17}N
- Molar mass: 223.319 g·mol^{−1}
- 3D model (JSmol): Interactive image
- SMILES: c1ccc(cc1)C3(c2ccccc2)CC(N)C3
- InChI: InChI=1S/C16H17N/c17-15-11-16(12-15,13-7-3-1-4-8-13)14-9-5-2-6-10-14/h1-10,15H,11-12,17H2; Key:IABBZBVTZRKDFW-UHFFFAOYSA-N

3,3,-Diphenylcyclobutanamine is a psychostimulant drug which was originally developed as an antidepressant in the late 1970s. It appears to inhibit the reuptake of serotonin, norepinephrine, and dopamine, and may also induce their release as well. The N-methyl and N,N-dimethyl analogues of the compound are also known and are more potent. All three agents produce locomotor stimulation in animal studies, with the N,N-dimethyl compound being the strongest.

== See also ==
- β-Phenylmethamphetamine
- Fezolamine
