= DOV Pharmaceutical =

Biotechnology company acquired in 2010

DOV Pharmaceutical was a biotechnology company that focused on therapies primarily for central nervous system conditions. It was founded in 1995 by former employees of American Cyanamid (which was acquired by Wyeth in 1994), and in 1998 it in-licensed drugs discovered at American Cyanamid for further development. It held an IPO on NASDQ in 2002, and its shares plunged days later after negative details about a past relationship between Élan and DOV emerged.

Phil Skolnick served as CSO from 2001 to 2009. Euthymics had been founded by Anthony McKinney and Frank Bymaster, a chemist who had worked at Eli Lilly on discovery and development of Prozac, Cymbalta, and Symbyax; the company was funded with $24 million from Novartis Venture Funds among others.

After several failed clinical trials, in 2010 Dov was acquired by Euthymics Bioscience which intended to continue development of Dov's antidepressant, amitifadine (DOV 21,947, renamed EB-1010).

Its drug candidates included:

- Indiplon for insomnia, licensed from Wyeth in 1998, which it licensed to Neurocrine Biosciences in 1998.
- Bicifadine, a triple-uptake inhibitor for pain, licensed from Wyeth in 1998,
- Triple-uptake inhibitors for depression and related psychiatric disorders: (DOV 21,947 and DOV 216,303) licensed from Wyeth in 1998. Merck sublicensed the rights in 2004, and terminated them in 2006.
- Ocinaplon for anxiety disorders.
- A proprietary formulation of diltiazem
- DOV 102,677, for the treatment of Parkinson's disease, restless leg syndrome, attention deficit disorder
- DOV 51,892, for anxiety disorders
- DOV-216,303, the racemic mixture that included amitifadine, which was discontinued after the patent covering it expired.
