= HP-505 =

Chemical compound

Identifiers
- IUPAC name: 3-phenyl-3H-spiro[isobenzofuran-1,4'-piperidine]
- CAS Number: 59142-94-8
- PubChem CID: 191510
- ChemSpider: 166303
- ChEMBL: ChEMBL436281
- CompTox Dashboard (EPA): DTXSID20974577

Chemical and physical data
- Formula: C_{18}H_{19}NO
- Molar mass: 265.356 g·mol^{−1}
- 3D model (JSmol): Interactive image
- SMILES: C1(C2OC3(CCNCC3)C4=C2C=CC=C4)=CC=CC=C1
- InChI: InChI=1S/C18H19NO/c1-2-6-14(7-3-1)17-15-8-4-5-9-16(15)18(20-17)10-12-19-13-11-18/h1-9,17,19H,10-13H2; Key:ZFJQWOMHWFYLPD-UHFFFAOYSA-N

HP-505 is a triple reuptake inhibitor that was investigated by Hoechst-Roussel Pharmaceuticals. In mice, HP-505 was a potent inhibitor of tetrabenazine-induced ptosis which may indicate antidepressant activity.

== Pharmacology ==
HP-505 IC_{50} (μM)
5-HT	NE	DA	NE:5-HT	DA:5-HT
0.19 ± 0.04	0.34 ± 0.1	0.66 ± 0.15	1.8	3.5

The inhibitory effect of HP-505 on serotonin reuptake is approximately 1.8 and 3.5 times stronger than on norepinephrine and dopamine, respectively. Subsequent investigations have found that HP-505 acts on presynaptic dopamine transporters and is devoid of anticholinergic effects.

== Synthesis ==
The N-methylated analog is called HP-365 [59142-29-9].

An older synthesis is available, although more modern methods exist now:

HP-365 patent:
