= M.G. 6669 =

Identifiers
- IUPAC name: trans-1-(4-Phenylcyclohexyl)ethylamine
- CAS Number: 74068-00-1 86336-35-8
- PubChem CID: 135185
- ChemSpider: 119098
- CompTox Dashboard (EPA): DTXSID30995516

Chemical and physical data
- Formula: C_{14}H_{21}N
- Molar mass: 203.329 g·mol^{−1}
- 3D model (JSmol): Interactive image
- SMILES: CC(C1CCC(CC1)C2=CC=CC=C2)N
- InChI: InChI=1S/C14H21N/c1-11(15)12-7-9-14(10-8-12)13-5-3-2-4-6-13/h2-6,11-12,14H,7-10,15H2,1H3; Key:DZWRYOJSAWKQIK-UHFFFAOYSA-N

M.G. 6669 is an antidepressant and central nervous system equilibrating agent.

== See also ==
- EXP-561
