= Brasofensine =

Chemical compound

Clinical data
- ATC code: none

Legal status
- Legal status: UK: Class A

Identifiers
- IUPAC name: (+)-(E)-1-[(1R,2R,3S)-3-(3,4-dichlorophenyl)-8-methyl-8-azabicyclo[3.2.1]octane-2-carbaldehyde O-methyloxime
- CAS Number: 171655-91-7
- PubChem CID: 9614919
- ChemSpider: 7888898
- UNII: 1YP2S94RVH
- ChEMBL: ChEMBL2104184
- CompTox Dashboard (EPA): DTXSID00905102

Chemical and physical data
- Formula: C_{16}H_{20}Cl_{2}N_{2}O
- Molar mass: 327.25 g·mol^{−1}
- 3D model (JSmol): Interactive image
- SMILES: Clc1ccc(cc1Cl)[C@H]3C[C@H]2N(C)[C@H](CC2)[C@@H]3\C=N\OC
- InChI: InChI=1S/C16H20Cl2N2O/c1-20-11-4-6-16(20)13(9-19-21-2)12(8-11)10-3-5-14(17)15(18)7-10/h3,5,7,9,11-13,16H,4,6,8H2,1-2H3/b19-9+/t11-,12+,13+,16+/m0/s1; Key:NRLIFEGHTNUYFL-QJDHNRDASA-N

Brasofensine (NS-2214, BMS-204756) is a phenyltropane dopamine reuptake inhibitor that had been under development by Bristol-Myers Squibb and defunct company NeuroSearch for the treatment of Parkinson's and Alzheimer's diseases.

== History ==
In 1996, brasofensine entered phase I trials in the United States and phase II trials in Denmark. From 1996 to 1999, Bristol-Myers Squibb (BMS) was involved in development and testing before exiting the collaboration with NeuroSearch. In 2001, its development was confirmed to be discontinued.

== Pharmacology ==
In animal models of Parkinson's disease, brasofensine was effective in stimulating locomotor activity and reversing akinesia. Phase II trials in humans were conducted in 1996 and brasofensine was shown to be both effective and well tolerated at a dose of 4 mg; however, development was stopped after in vivo cis-anti isomerization of the 2α-methyloxime group was reported.

In Parkison's disease, symptoms do not begin to manifest until there has been an 80% reduction in dopaminergic neurons, particularly in the substantia nigra brain region.

=== Metabolism and distribution ===
Brasofensine is not particularly stable and is readily metabolized. It was studied in humans in doses ranging from 2-50 mg. Because metabolism in rats is much greater than in humans, the amount of metabolites detected in their urine (and feces) was also much greater than for humans, who excrete more of the product intact. In radiolabeling studies using ^{14}C, most (~90%) of the ^{14}C was detected in the urine of humans, whereas for rats as much as 80% of the ^{14}C was in their feces.

The isomerization of brasofensine did not involve epimerization at 2-position of the tropane ring, but rather involved the E/Z-isomerization of the imine (i.e. "methyl-aldoxime"). It was believed that this process occurs in vivo, although it cannot be ruled out as a possibility that some isomerization also occurs prior to ingestion. The (Z)-isomer has been assigned the name BMS-205912.

Imine formation is a reversible process, and in the study by Zhu et al., none of the aldehyde was recovered/detected by GC-MS. Instead, the breakdown products were N-demethylated metabolites.
