= D-161 =

Chemical compound

Identifiers
- IUPAC name: 4-((((3S,6S)-6-Benzhydryltetrahydro-2H-pyran-3-yl)amino)methyl)phenol
- CAS Number: 869114-42-1
- PubChem CID: 11545250
- ChemSpider: 9720029

Chemical and physical data
- Formula: C_{25}H_{27}NO_{2}
- Molar mass: 373.496 g·mol^{−1}
- 3D model (JSmol): Interactive image
- SMILES: Oc2ccc(cc2)CNC(CC3)COC3C(c1ccccc1)c4ccccc4
- InChI: InChI=1S/C25H27NO2/c27-23-14-11-19(12-15-23)17-26-22-13-16-24(28-18-22)25(20-7-3-1-4-8-20)21-9-5-2-6-10-21/h1-12,14-15,22,24-27H,13,16-18H2/t22-,24-/m0/s1; Key:CFCFEXCFOQWYQK-UPVQGACJSA-N

D-161 is a chemical known in research circles as a triple reuptake inhibitor. Although this compound has lent support to the inclusion of dopamine in the monoamine hypothesis of depression, D-161 has not been tested in clinical trials.

A more recent study was reported.

A couple of patents are also disclosed.

== Synthesis ==
The synthesis of this agent has been reported.
