= DOV-216,303 =

Chemical compound

Legal status
- Legal status: US: Investigational New Drug

Identifiers
- IUPAC name: 1-(3,4-dichlorophenyl)-3-azabicyclo[3.1.0]hexane
- CAS Number: 66504-40-3
- PubChem CID: 9795276
- ChemSpider: 7971043
- UNII: 5W2YA6F455
- ChEMBL: ChEMBL528995

Chemical and physical data
- Formula: C_{11}H_{11}Cl_{2}N
- Molar mass: 228.12 g·mol^{−1}
- 3D model (JSmol): Interactive image
- SMILES: C1C2C1(CNC2)C3=CC(=C(C=C3)Cl)Cl
- InChI: InChI=1S/C11H11Cl2N/c12-9-2-1-7(3-10(9)13)11-4-8(11)5-14-6-11/h1-3,8,14H,4-6H2; Key:BSMNRYCSBFHEMQ-UHFFFAOYSA-N

DOV 216,303 is an experimental antidepressant drug originally developed by DOV Pharmaceutical and was licensed to Merck & Co. in 2004; Merck and DOV terminated their relationship in December 2006.

It is a triple reuptake inhibitor (TRI), or serotonin-norepinephrine-dopamine reuptake inhibitor (SNDRI). It is the racemic mixture of amitifadine (DOV-21,947) and its (–)-enantiomer, DOV-102,677. Its IC_{50} values for SERT, NET, and DAT are K_{i} 14 nM, 20 nM, and 78 nM, respectively.

As of March 2008, DOV had no intention to further develop DOV-216,303 because the patent on the compound had expired.

In a mouse model, DOV-216,303 has shown the ability to promote recovery after spinal cord contusion.

== See also ==
- Bicifadine
