= Bicifadine =

Chemical compound

Clinical data
- Routes of administration: Oral
- ATC code: none

Legal status
- Legal status: US: Unscheduled

Pharmacokinetic data
- Elimination half-life: 1.6 hours
- Excretion: renal

Identifiers
- IUPAC name: 1-(4-Methylphenyl)-3-azabicyclo[3.1.0]hexane
- CAS Number: 71195-57-8
- PubChem CID: 47953
- ChemSpider: 9889978
- UNII: B0SV3N7J3H
- ChEMBL: ChEMBL511099
- CompTox Dashboard (EPA): DTXSID20867995
- ECHA InfoCard: 100.124.957

Chemical and physical data
- Formula: C_{12}H_{15}N
- Molar mass: 173.259 g·mol^{−1}
- 3D model (JSmol): Interactive image
- SMILES: c1cc(ccc1C)[C@]32CNC[C@@H]2C3
- InChI: InChI=1S/C12H15N/c1-9-2-4-10(5-3-9)12-6-11(12)7-13-8-12/h2-5,11,13H,6-8H2,1H3/t11-,12+/m0/s1; Key:OFYVIGTWSQPCLF-NWDGAFQWSA-N

Bicifadine (DOV-220,075) is a serotonin-norepinephrine-dopamine reuptake inhibitor (SNDRI) discovered at American Cyanamid as an analgesic drug candidate, and licensed to DOV Pharmaceutical in 1998 after American Cyanamid was acquired by Wyeth.

In January 2007, Dov licensed the rights to bicifadine to XTL Biopharmaceuticals after bicifadine failed in a phase III clinical trial for chronic low back pain. XTL ran a phase IIb clinical trial for pain caused by diabetic neuropathy, which failed in 2008;l. XTL terminated the agreement in 2010. In 2010, Dov was acquired by Euthymics Bioscience which intended to continue development of other candidates from Dov's portfolio.

Bicifadine has a non-opioid, non-NSAID mechanism for the treatment of pain, which should have less abuse potential than opioid drugs and less propensity to cause gastric ulcers than NSAID drugs. While the drug is purported to be a serotonin (SERT) and noradrenaline transporter (NET) inhibitor, it also has effects at the dopamine transporter (DAT), effectively making it a broad-spectrum monoamine transporter inhibitor or "triple reuptake inhibitor."

== See also ==
- DOV-216,303
