= NS-2359 =

Chemical compound

Clinical data
- ATC code: none

Identifiers
- IUPAC name: (1R,2R,3S,5S)-3-(3,4-dichlorophenyl)-2-(methoxymethyl)-8-azabicyclo[3.2.1]octane
- PubChem CID: 11408320
- UNII: 76H76554PA

Chemical and physical data
- Formula: C_{15}H_{19}Cl_{2}NO
- Molar mass: 300.22 g·mol^{−1}
- 3D model (JSmol): Interactive image
- SMILES: Clc1ccc(cc1Cl)C(C2COC)CC3NC2CC3
- InChI: InChI=1S/C15H19Cl2NO/c1-19-8-12-11(7-10-3-5-15(12)18-10)9-2-4-13(16)14(17)6-9/h2,4,6,10-12,15,18H,3,5,7-8H2,1H3/t10-,11+,12+,15+/m0/s1; Key:FPTPUYCHSWIWIB-FUTJPDQTSA-N

NS-2359 (GSK-372475) is a serotonin-norepinephrine-dopamine reuptake inhibitor. It was under development by GlaxoSmithKline (GSK) as an antidepressant, but was discontinued in 2009 when phase II clinical trials showed the drug was not effective and not well tolerated. The results did not support further effort by the company. NS-2359 was also in clinical trials for the treatment of ADHD, phase II having been completed in 2007. A phase I clinical trial exploring the effect of NS-2359 on cocaine-dependent individuals was completed in 2002.

== See also ==
- Tesofensine
