= Amitifadine =

Chemical compound

Clinical data
- Pronunciation: (/æmɪˈtɪfədiːn/ am-i-TIF-ə-deen)
- Other names: DOV-21,947; EB-1010

Legal status
- Legal status: US: Investigational New Drug

Identifiers
- IUPAC name: (1R,5S)-1-(3,4-dichlorophenyl)-3-azabicyclo[3.1.0]hexane
- CAS Number: 410074-73-6
- PubChem CID: 11658655
- ChemSpider: 9833390
- UNII: GE0J375F8F
- KEGG: D10088
- ChEMBL: ChEMBL592374
- CompTox Dashboard (EPA): DTXSID001025835

Chemical and physical data
- Formula: C_{11}H_{11}Cl_{2}N
- Molar mass: 228.12 g·mol^{−1}
- 3D model (JSmol): Interactive image
- SMILES: C1[C@@](CN2)(C1C2)C(=C1)C=C(C(Cl)=C1)Cl
- InChI: InChI=1S/C11H11Cl2N/c12-9-2-1-7(3-10(9)13)11-4-8(11)5-14-6-11/h1-3,8,14H,4-6H2/t8-,11+/m1/s1; Key:BSMNRYCSBFHEMQ-KCJUWKMLSA-N

Amitifadine (developmental code names DOV-21,947, EB-1010) is a serotonin–norepinephrine–dopamine reuptake inhibitor (SNDRI) or so-called triple reuptake inhibitor (TRI) which is or was being developed by Euthymics Bioscience. It was under development for the treatment of major depressive disorder, but in May 2013, it was reported that the drug failed to show superior efficacy to placebo in a phase IIb/IIIa clinical trial. it was suggested that this may have been due to the drug being underdosed. In September 2017, development of amitifadine for the treatment of major depressive disorder was finally officially discontinued. As of September 2017, it is still listed as being under development for the treatment of alcoholism and smoking withdrawal.

== Pharmacology ==
K_{i} values for SERT, NET, and DAT of amitifadine are 99 nM, 262 nM, and 213 nM. The IC_{50} values for serotonin, norepinephrine and dopamine uptake are 12, 23 and 96 nM, respectively.

Amitifadine and isomers
| Compound | Uptake (IC_{50}, nM) | | | Binding (K_{i}, nM) | | |
| Compound | 5-HT | NE | DA | SERT | NET | DAT |
|---|---|---|---|---|---|---|
| Amitifadine | 12 | 23 | 96 | 100 | 260 | 210 |
| DOV-216,303 | 14 | 20 | 78 | 190 | 380 | 190 |
| DOV-102,677 | 130 | 100 | 130 | 740 | 1000 | 220 |

Amitifadine reduces the duration of immobility in the forced swim test in rats with an oral minimum effective dose (MED) of 5 mg/kg. This antidepressant-like effect manifests in the absence of significant increases in motor activity at doses of up to 20 mg/kg. Amitifadine also produces a dose-dependent reduction in immobility in the tail suspension test, with an oral MED of 5 mg/kg. In microdialysis studies, amitifadine increased extracellular levels of serotonin, norepinephrine and dopamine in brain regions and did not induce hyperactivity in rats. Results in a small clinical trial indicated that amitifadine had statistically significant antidepressant effects and was well tolerated.

== Chemistry ==
DOV stereochemistry

Amitifadine is the (+)-enantiomer of DOV-216,303, and its (−)-enantiomer is DOV-102,677.

Amitifadine is very similar in structure to bicifadine and centanafadine.

A so-called "bifunctional molecule" from a separate organization called GSK 598809 has related structure.
