= EXP-561 =

Chemical compound

Clinical data
- Routes of administration: Oral
- ATC code: none

Legal status
- Legal status: In general: uncontrolled

Identifiers
- IUPAC name: 4-phenylbicyclo[2.2.2]octan-1-amine
- CAS Number: 10206-89-0; hydrochloride: 10207-08-6
- PubChem CID: 27696
- ChemSpider: 25769
- UNII: 1P958G9T1V; hydrochloride: 6S9H885MKF
- CompTox Dashboard (EPA): DTXSID20144571

Chemical and physical data
- Formula: C_{14}H_{19}N
- Molar mass: 201.313 g·mol^{−1}
- 3D model (JSmol): Interactive image
- SMILES: NC12CCC(CC1)(CC2)C3=CC=CC=C3
- InChI: InChI=1S/C14H19N.ClH/c15-14-9-6-13(7-10-14,8-11-14)12-4-2-1-3-5-12;/h1-5H,6-11,15H2;1H; Key:LTHJBDQSFIGMAZ-UHFFFAOYSA-N

EXP-561 is an investigational drug that acts as an inhibitor of the reuptake of serotonin, dopamine, and norepinephrine. It was developed in the 1960s by Du Pont and was suggested as a potential antidepressant but failed in trials and was never marketed.

SAR simplification in the molecular structure leads to a compound called 4-Phenylcyclohexylamine [19992-45-1]. This is produced by reduction of the oxime of a commercially available compound that is called 4-phenylcyclohexanone. It is noteworthy to point out that this precursor might foreseeably share a dual use in the synthesis of danavorexton.

In one method of synthesis, EXP-561 is made from a chemical that is called 3-carboethoxy-6-phenyl-2-pyrone [6465-14-1]. The disadvantage of this method is that it needed to be heated with ethylene in benzene solvent at 200C for 16 hours at 1000 atmospheres, so a suitable pressure vessel was needed. Although, alternative protocols were addressed that sought to circumvent this limitation. However, this much pressure seemed excessive and a more recent patent only employed 75 bar pressure.

== See also ==
- M.G. 6669
