= NeuroSearch =

Biotechnology company

NeuroSearch A/S was a Danish biotechnology company specializing in pharmaceuticals for treating diseases and disorders affecting the central nervous system (CNS).

== History ==
NeuroSearch was founded in Denmark in April 1989 as one of the first companies in the Medicon Valley area around Copenhagen and Malmö, with 25 employees and €4,000,000 in private financing. Its Danish founders included femoxetine and paroxetine inventor Jørgen Buus Lassen and Asger Aamund (da). In 1996, NeuroSearch was listed on NASDAQ OMX Copenhagen A/S under the ticker symbol NEUR.CO.

In 2006, three drug candidates from a novel class of compounds the company refers to as dopaminergic stabilizers were added to the development pipeline through the acquisition of Carlsson Research AB, a privately owned Swedish company. In 2010, NeuroSearch reported the results of MermaiHD (Multinational EuRopean Multicentre ACR16 study In Huntington’s Disease), the first study in the Huntexil phase 3 programme. This study, examined the effects of Huntexil in almost 440 patients with Huntington’s disease, but despite some suggestion of improved motor function the drug did not produce improvement on the study's primary endpoint. The US Food and Drug Administration and European Medicines Agency have instructed NeuroSearch that a successful phase 3 trial that meets its primary motor endpoint will be needed if the drug is to be approved for patient use.

In 2008, results demonstrating significant weight loss for tesofensine compared with placebo were published in The Lancet. The investigators concluded that tesofensine could produce at least twice the weight loss of currently approved anti-obesity drugs and should be evaluated in phase 3 trials.

In 2012, the company was no longer able to attract funding for continuing its R&D activities. The company sold its rights to its lead product candidate, Pridopidine for the treatment of patients with Huntington's disease to Teva Pharmaceutical Industries. The clinical development of the remaining pipeline projects was stopped and the company is still trying to sell the remaining assets.

In 2014, NeuroSearch transferred the rights to tesofensine to Saniona.

In 2018, after a voluntary public takeover offer, transport company NTG acquired all Neurosearch shares.
