= Tesofensine =

Chemical compound

Clinical data
- Pregnancy category: Not applicable
- Routes of administration: Oral
- Drug class: Serotonin-norepinephrine-dopamine reuptake inhibitor; Sympathomimetic; Appetite suppressant
- ATC code: None

Legal status
- Legal status: US: Investigational New Drug

Pharmacokinetic data
- Bioavailability: 90%
- Metabolism: 15–20% renal; hepatic: CYP3A4
- Elimination half-life: 220 hours
- Excretion: Not applicable

Identifiers
- IUPAC name: (1R,2R,3S)-3-(3,4-dichlorophenyl)-2-(ethoxymethyl)-8-methyl-8-azabicyclo[3.2.1]octane
- CAS Number: 195875-84-4
- PubChem CID: 11370864
- ChemSpider: 9545781
- UNII: BLH9UKX9V1
- CompTox Dashboard (EPA): DTXSID70905114

Chemical and physical data
- Formula: C_{17}H_{23}Cl_{2}NO
- Molar mass: 328.28 g·mol^{−1}
- 3D model (JSmol): Interactive image
- SMILES: Clc1ccc(cc1Cl)[C@H]3C[C@H]2N(C)[C@H](CC2)[C@@H]3COCC
- InChI: InChI=1S/C17H23Cl2NO/c1-3-21-10-14-13(9-12-5-7-17(14)20(12)2)11-4-6-15(18)16(19)8-11/h4,6,8,12-14,17H,3,5,7,9-10H2,1-2H3/t12-,13+,14+,17+/m0/s1; Key:VCVWXKKWDOJNIT-ZOMKSWQUSA-N

Tesofensine (NS2330) is a serotonin–norepinephrine–dopamine reuptake inhibitor from the phenyltropane family of drugs, which is being developed for the treatment of obesity. Tesofensine was originally developed by a Danish biotechnology company, NeuroSearch, who transferred the rights to Saniona in 2014.

As of 2019, tesofensine has been discontinued for the treatment of Alzheimer's and Parkinson's disease but is in phase III clinical trial for obesity.

== History ==
Tesofensine was originally investigated for the treatment of Alzheimer's disease and Parkinson's disease, and was subsequently dropped from development for these applications after early trial results showed limited efficacy for treatment of these diseases. However, weight loss was consistently reported as an adverse event in the original studies, especially in overweight or obese patients. Therefore, it was decided to pursue development of tesofensine for the treatment of obesity.

Tesofensine primarily acts as an appetite suppressant, but possibly also acts by increasing resting energy expenditure. A recent study showed that tesofensine modulates neuronal activity of the lateral hypothalamus, silencing GABAergic neurons, a brain region involved in feeding. Phase II clinical trials for the treatment of obesity have been successfully completed.

== Pharmacology ==
=== Metabolism and half-life ===
Tesofensine has a long half-life of about 9 days (220 h) "and is mainly metabolized by cytochrome P4503A4 (CYP3A4) to its desalkyl metabolite M1" NS2360. NS2360 is the only metabolite detectable in human plasma. It has a longer half-life than tesofensine, i.e. approximately 16 days (374 h) in humans, and has an exposure of 31–34% of the parent compound at steady state. In vivo data indicate that NS2360 is responsible for approximately 6% of the activity of tesofensine. As in animals, the kidney appears to play only a minor role in the clearance of tesofensine in humans (about 15–20%).

=== Transporter selectivity ===
Originally it had been reported that Tesofensine has IC_{50} of 8.0, 3.2 and 11.0nM at the DAT, NET, and SERT. More recently, though, the following data was submitted: IC_{50} (nM) NET 1.7, SERT 11, DAT 65.[ cited in] The revised IC_{50}'s would adequately explain the lack of efficacy in treating Parkinson's disease, i.e. insufficient dopamine reuptake inhibition relative to norepinephrine and serotonin. This could also help account for why Tesofensine is not reliably self-administered by human stimulant abusers since it has been believed to be the case that DAT inhibition is necessary for this and not NET inhibition. At therapeutic doses, Tesofensine also induces less stereotypy than other DA acting appetite suppressants.

Tesofensine also indirectly potentiates cholinergic neurotransmission proven to have beneficial effects on cognition, particularly in learning and memory. Sustained treatment with tesofensine has been shown to increase BDNF levels in the brain, and may possibly have an antidepressant effect.

== Clinical trials ==
Phase IIB trial (TIPO-1) results reported in The Lancet showed levels of weight loss over a 6-month period that were significantly greater than those achieved with any other drugs available at the time. Patients lost an average of 12.8 kg on the 1 mg dose, 11.3 kg on the 0.5 mg dose and 6.7 kg on the 0.25 mg dose, compared with a 2.2 kg loss in the placebo group.

All participants were instructed to follow a diet with a 300 kcal deficit and to increase their physical activity gradually to 30–60 minutes of exercise per day. The placebo-subtracted mean weight losses were 4.5%, 9.2% and 10.6% in the 0.25 mg, 0.5 mg and 1 mg dose groups, respectively. The weight loss seen in the Phase IIB trial was approximately double that produced by medications that had been approved (as of 2008) by the US Food and Drug Administration (FDA) for the treatment of obesity.

NeuroSearch has also reported interim results from a 48-week, open-label, extension trial (TIPO-4) in which 140 patients who completed the 24-week phase IIB trial (TIPO-1) were re-enrolled after an average of 3 months' wash-out. All were initially treated with 0.5 mg tesofensine once daily but up-titration to 1.0 mg once daily was allowed in the first 24 weeks of the extension study. At this time point, all subjects were continued on the 0.5 mg dose for an additional 24 weeks. The 24-week interim results for those who were previously treated with tesofensine 0.5 mg in TIPO-1 showed a total mean weight loss of between 13 kg and 14 kg over 48 weeks of treatment. Furthermore, TIPO-4 confirmed the TIPO-1 results since those patients who were previously treated with placebo lost approximately 9 kg in the first 24 weeks of the TIPO-4 study.

== Adverse events ==
In general, the safety profile of tesofensine is similar to currently approved medications for the treatment of obesity. The most commonly reported side effects in the obese population were dry mouth, headache, nausea, insomnia, diarrhea and constipation. A dose-dependent pattern was observed for dry mouth and insomnia. The overall withdrawal rate due to adverse events in clinical trials in the obese population was 13% with tesofensine and 6% with placebo. Blood pressure and heart rate increases with the therapeutically relevant doses of tesofensine (0.25 mg and 0.5 mg) were 1–3 mmHg and up to 8 bpm, respectively.

At the conclusion of phase II clinical trials, Saniona announced that tesofensine was well tolerated with low incidence of adverse events, low increase in heart rate and no significant effect on blood pressure.

== See also ==
- Hyperforin
- Phencyclidine
- Indatraline
- Dexanabinol
