= C11H13NO2 =

The molecular formula C_{11}H_{13}NO_{2} (molar mass: 191.23 g/mol) may refer to:

- Ephedroxane
- Fenmetramide
- Idrocilamide
- MDAT
- 3Me6,7MDTIQ
- 5,6-Methylenedioxy-N-methyl-2-aminoindane
