= C20H21NO =

The molecular formula C_{20}H_{21}NO (molar mass: 291.39 g/mol, exact mass: 291.1623 u) may refer to:

- Butinoline (Azulone)
- Cotriptyline (SD-2203-01)
- Danitracen
- JWH-030
- PRC200-SS
