= C17H23NO4 =

The molecular formula C_{17}H_{23}NO_{4} (molar mass: 305.37 g/mol, exact mass: 305.1627 u) may refer to:

- Anisodamine, or 7β-hydroxyhyoscyamine
- Bucumolol
- Cetraxate
