= Fentiazac =

NSAID analgesic medication

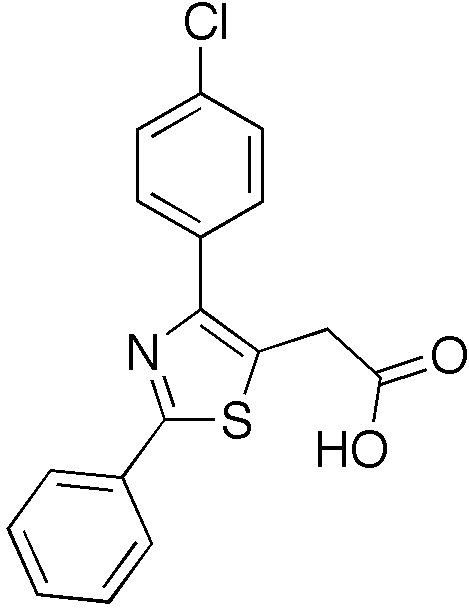

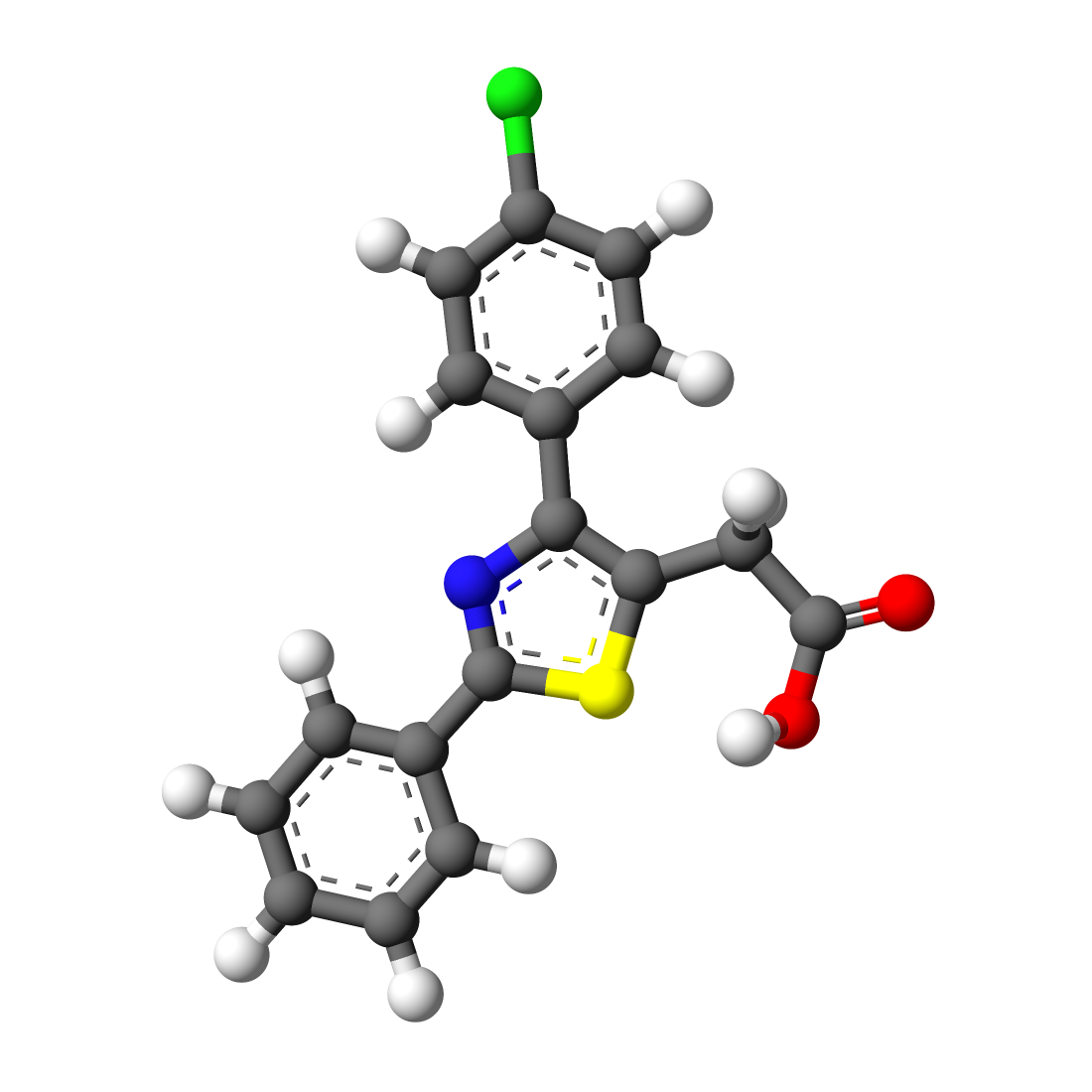

Clinical data
- Trade names: Norvedan
- AHFS/Drugs.com: International Drug Names
- ATC code: M02AA14 (WHO)

Identifiers
- IUPAC name: 2-[4-(4-chlorophenyl)-2-phenyl-1,3-thiazol-5-yl]acetic acid
- CAS Number: 18046-21-4
- PubChem CID: 28871
- ChemSpider: 26854
- UNII: 0YHF6E6NLS
- KEGG: D01975
- ChEMBL: ChEMBL589092
- CompTox Dashboard (EPA): DTXSID8023050
- ECHA InfoCard: 100.038.129

Chemical and physical data
- Formula: C_{17}H_{12}ClNO_{2}S
- Molar mass: 329.80 g·mol^{−1}
- 3D model (JSmol): Interactive image
- Melting point: 162–163 °C (324–325 °F)
- SMILES: c1ccc(cc1)c2nc(c(s2)CC(=O)O)c3ccc(cc3)Cl
- InChI: InChI=1S/C17H12ClNO2S/c18-13-8-6-11(7-9-13)16-14(10-15(20)21)22-17(19-16)12-4-2-1-3-5-12/h1-9H,10H2,(H,20,21); Key:JIEKMACRVQTPRC-UHFFFAOYSA-N

Fentiazac is a thiazole-based nonsteroidal anti-inflammatory drug (NSAID) developed for use in joint and muscular pain. Like most other NSAIDs, it acts through inhibition of prostaglandin synthesis, via non-selective inhibition of both COX-1 and COX-2. First described in 1974, it was synthesized using the Hantzsch thiazole synthesis.

Fentiazac was marketed under the trade-name Norvedan (among others), but its market status is currently unknown and assumed to be discontinued.

== See also ==
- Fenclozic acid
