= C14H22N2O3 =

The molecular formula C_{14}H_{22}N_{2}O_{3} (molar mass: 266.34 g/mol, exact mass: 266.1630 u) may refer to:

- Atenolol
- Bucolome (Paramidine)
- Practolol
- Trimetazidine
