= C18H29NO4 =

The molecular formula C_{18}H_{29}NO_{4} (molar mass: 323.43 g/mol, exact mass: 323.2097 u) may refer to:

- Bufetolol
- Cicloprolol
