= C20H20N2O2 =

The molecular formula C_{20}H_{20}N_{2}O_{2} (molar mass: 320.385 g/mol, exact mass: 320.1525 u) may refer to:

- Befuraline
- Feprazone
