= C24H26N2O6 =

The molecular formula C_{24}H_{26}N_{2}O_{6} (molar mass: 438.473 g/mol, exact mass: 438.1791 u) may refer to:

- JTE-907
- Suxibuzone
