= C10H14N2O =

The molecular formula C_{10}H_{14}N_{2}O (molar mass: 178.23 g/mol, exact mass: 178.1106 u) may refer to:

- Bupicomide
- Epiboxidine
- Nikethamide
