= C14H16N4 =

The molecular formula C_{14}H_{16}N_{4} (molar mass: 240.30 g/mol, exact mass: 240.1375 u) may refer to:

- Imiquimod
- Budralazine
