= List of types of killing =

In the English language, terms for types of killing often end in the suffix -cide.

== Suicide ==
- Altruistic suicide, a suicide for the benefit of others
- Medicide, a suicide accomplished with the aid of a physician
- Murder-suicide, a suicide committed immediately after one or more murders
- Self-immolation, a suicide by fire, often as a form of protest
- Suicide by cop, acting in a threatening manner so as to provoke a lethal response from law enforcement
- Vehicular suicide, a suicide by a motor vehicle

== Killing of other people ==
All of these are considered types of homicide.

=== Killing of family members ===
- Familicide, the killing of a spouse and children (Latin: familia "family")
- Filicide or prolicide, the killing of one's own child (Latin: filius "son" and Latin: filia "daughter").
- Fratricide, the killing of a brother (Latin: frater "brother")
- Honour killing, the killing of a family member perceived to have brought disgrace to the family
- Mariticide, the killing of one's husband (Latin: maritus "husband")
- Matricide, the killing of one's mother (Latin: mater "mother")
- Parricide or parenticide, the killing of one's mother, father, or other close relative
- Patricide, the killing of one's father (Latin: pater "father")
- Senicide, the killing of one's elderly family members (Latin: senex "old man")
- Siblicide, the killing of a sibling
- Sororicide, the killing of one's sister (Latin: soror "sister")
- Uxoricide, the killing of one's wife (Latin: uxor "wife")

=== Killing of children ===
- Infanticide, the killing of a child within the first year of their life
- Neonaticide, the killing of an infant within the first 24 hours or month (varies by individual and jurisdiction) of their life
- Pedicide, the killing of children

=== Killing by governments ===
- Capital punishment, the judicial killing of a criminal
- Democide or populicide, the killing of people by a government
- Extrajudicial killing, the killing of people by a government without due process
- Targeted killing, a form of assassination by a government against their perceived enemy

=== Killing of prominent people ===
- Assassination, the killing of a prominent person for political, religious, or monetary reasons
- Eliticide, the killing of the elites of a population
- Papicide, the killing of a pope (Ancient Greek: πάππας (páppas) "father").
- Regicide, the killing of a monarch or sovereign, a king/queen (Latin: rex, gen. regis "king")
- Tyrannicide, the killing of a tyrant

=== Killing in wartime ===
- Casualty, death (or injury) in wartime
- Collateral damage or friendly fire, the unintentional killing of persons during a military attack who were not the target
- Decimation, in ancient Rome, a form of military discipline in which every tenth man in a group was executed by members of his cohort
- Fragging, the deliberate killing of a fellow soldier
- Fratricide, the accidental killing of a fellow soldier

=== Killing of others ===
- Amicicide, the killing of a friend (Latin: amicus "friend")
- Androcide, the systematic killing of men
- Contract killing, a form of murder or assassination in which a party is hired to kill a person or people
- Euthanasia or mercy killing, killing for compassionate reasons; e.g., significant injury or disease
- Femicide, gynecide, gynaecide, or gynocide, the systematic killing of women
- Gendercide, the systematic killing of members of a specific sex or gender
- Geronticide, the killing of the elderly (also: Geriatricide)
- Genocide, the systematic extermination of an entire national, racial, religious, or ethnic group
- Homicide, the killing of a person (Latin: homo "man")
  - Justifiable homicide, a defense to culpable homicide (criminal or negligent homicide)
- Human sacrifice, the killing of a human for sacrificial, often religious, reasons
- Lynching, the public killing of an individual without due process
- Massacre, the killing of many people at one time or place
- Mass murder or spree killing, the killing of many people
- Murder, the unlawful killing of a human by another human
- Manslaughter, murder, but under legally mitigating circumstances
- Omnicide, the act of killing all humans, to bring about the extinction of the human species (Latin: omni "all, everyone").
- Serial killer, a person who murders three or more people, with the killings taking place over a significant period of time in separate events
- Spree killer, someone who commits a criminal act that involves two or more murders in a short time, often in multiple locations

== Killing of non-human animals and other organisms ==
- Algaecide, a chemical agent that kills algae
- Acaricide, a chemical agent that kills mites
- Avicide, a chemical agent that kills birds
- Bactericide, a chemical agent that kills bacteria
- Biocide, a chemical agent that kills a broad spectrum of living organisms
- Fungicide, a chemical agent or biological organism used to kill or inhibit fungi or fungal spores
- Germicide, an agent that kills germs, especially pathogenic microorganisms
- Herbicide, an agent that kills unwanted plants
- Insecticide, an agent that kills unwanted insects
- Larvicide (also larvacide), an insecticide targeted against the larval life stage of an insect
- Microbicide, an agent used to kill or reduce the infectiousness of microorganisms
- Miticide, a chemical used to kill mites
- Nemacide (also nematicide, nematocide), a chemical to eradicate or kill nematodes
- Parasiticide, an agent used to destroy parasites
- Pediculicide, an agent that kills head lice
- Pesticide, an agent used to destroy or repel a pest
- Rodenticide, an agent that kills rodents (especially rats and mice)
- Scabicide, a chemical agent for killing scabies
- Teniacide (also taeniacide, tenicide), a chemical agent that kills tape worms
- Theriocide, the killing of an animal by a human (Ancient Greek: therion "wild animal, beast")
- Vermicide, an agent used to kill parasitic intestinal worms
- Virucide (also viricide), an agent capable of destroying or inhibiting viruses
- Vulpicide (also vulpecide), the killing of a fox by methods other than by hunting it with hounds

== Killing in fiction and mythology ==
- Deicide, the killing of a god or divine being
- Xenocide, the killing of an entire intelligent species

== See also ==
- Spermicide, a contraceptive agent to render sperm inert and prevent fertilization of an egg
- Letting die, withholding medical care or other forms of inaction that result in death
- Manner of death, a classification made after autopsy
