= Etofenamate =

NSAID analgesic medication

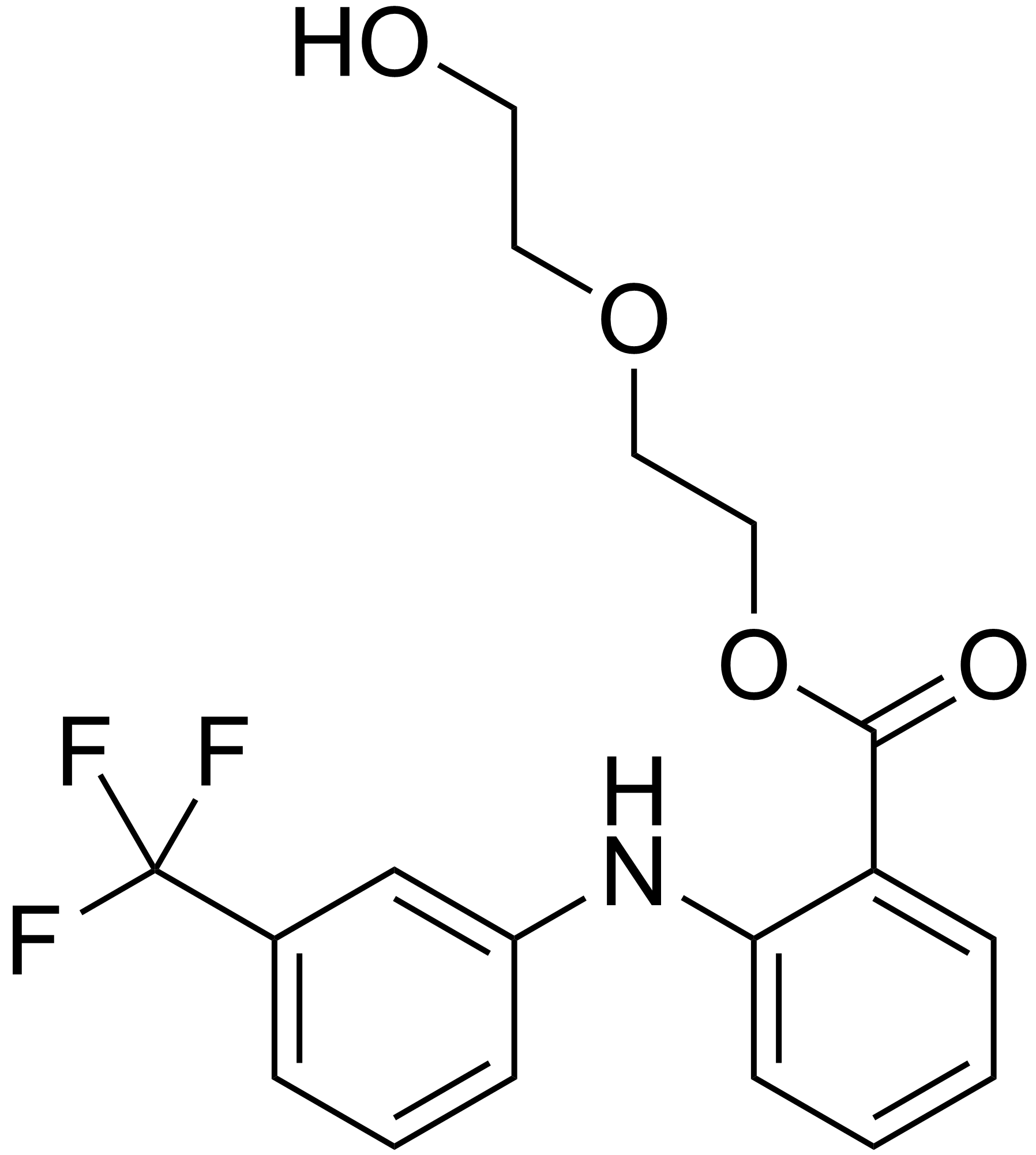

Clinical data
- AHFS/Drugs.com: International Drug Names
- Routes of administration: Topical (cream, gel, spray)
- ATC code: M02AA06 (WHO)

Legal status
- Legal status: In general: Over-the-counter (OTC)

Pharmacokinetic data
- Protein binding: 98–99%
- Metabolites: Flufenamic acid, hydroxyl derivatives
- Excretion: 35% renal, mostly biliary

Identifiers
- IUPAC name: 2-(2-hydroxyethoxy)ethyl 2-[ [3-(trifluoromethyl)phenyl]amino]benzoate
- CAS Number: 30544-47-9
- PubChem CID: 35375
- DrugBank: DB08984
- ChemSpider: 32560
- UNII: KZF0XM66JC
- KEGG: D04102
- CompTox Dashboard (EPA): DTXSID2045448
- ECHA InfoCard: 100.045.650

Chemical and physical data
- Formula: C_{18}H_{18}F_{3}NO_{4}
- Molar mass: 369.340 g·mol^{−1}
- 3D model (JSmol): Interactive image
- SMILES: FC(F)(F)c1cc(ccc1)Nc2ccccc2C(=O)OCCOCCO
- InChI: InChI=1S/C18H18F3NO4/c19-18(20,21)13-4-3-5-14(12-13)22-16-7-2-1-6-15(16)17(24)26-11-10-25-9-8-23/h1-7,12,22-23H,8-11H2; Key:XILVEPYQJIOVNB-UHFFFAOYSA-N

Etofenamate is a nonsteroidal anti-inflammatory drug (NSAID) used for the treatment of joint and muscular pain. It is available for topical application as a cream, a gel or as a spray.

Etofenamate is very toxic to aquatic life, with long lasting effects.
