= Epanolol =

Names
- IUPAC name (RS)-N-[2-([3-(2-cyanophenoxy)-2-hydroxypropyl]amino)ethyl]-2-(4-hydroxyphenyl)acetamide

Identifiers
CAS Number	86880-51-5
3D model (JSmol)	Interactive image
ChemSpider	65013
KEGG	D06646
PubChem CID	72014
UNII	9KGC55KP6A
CompTox Dashboard (EPA)	DTXSID90868959
- InChI: InChI=1S/C20H23N3O4/c21-12-16-3-1-2-4-19(16)27-14-18(25)13-22-9-10-23-20(26)11-15-5-7-17(24)8-6-15/h1-8,18,22,24-25H,9-11,13-14H2,(H,23,26) Key: YARKMNAWFIMDKV-UHFFFAOYSA-N
- SMILES: C1=CC=C(C(=C1)C#N)OCC(CNCCNC(=O)CC2=CC=C(C=C2)O)O

Properties
Chemical formula	C_{20}H_{23}N_{3}O_{4}
Molar mass	369.41432

Pharmacology
ATC code	C07AB10 (WHO)
- Except where otherwise noted, data are given for materials in their standard state (at 25 °C [77 °F], 100 kPa). Infobox references

Epanolol is a beta blocker. developed by Imperial Chemical Industries.

== Synthesis ==

The ester methyl 4-benzyloxyphenylacetate (1) is treated with ethylenediamine to give the amide (3). Separately, 2-cyanophenol (4) is reacted with epichlorohydrin and sodium hydroxide to produce the benzonitrile derivative (5). Combination of (3) and (5) by heating in propanol gives (6). Lastly, catalytic hydrogenation removes the benzyl protecting group and yields epanolol.

== See also ==
- Bunitrolol
- Bucindolol
