= Benzydamine =

Locally acting nonsteroidal anti-inflammatory drug

Clinical data
- Trade names: Maxtra Gargle, Difflam, Tantum verde
- AHFS/Drugs.com: International Drug Names
- Pregnancy category: AU: B2
- Routes of administration: Oral, topical
- ATC code: A01AD02 (WHO) G02CC03 (WHO) M01AX07 (WHO) M02AA05 (WHO) R02AX03 (WHO)

Legal status
- Legal status: AU: S4 (Prescription only) / Schedule 2; BR: Class C1 (Other controlled substances); UK: P and POM; EU: OTC

Pharmacokinetic data
- Protein binding: <20%
- Elimination half-life: 13 hours
- Excretion: Kidney

Identifiers
- IUPAC name: 3-(1-benzyl-1H-indazol-3-yloxy)-N,N-dimethylpropan-1-amine
- CAS Number: 642-72-8
- PubChem CID: 12555
- ChemSpider: 12036
- UNII: 4O21U048EF
- KEGG: D07516
- ChEBI: CHEBI:94563
- ChEMBL: ChEMBL12610
- CompTox Dashboard (EPA): DTXSID7047859
- ECHA InfoCard: 100.010.354

Chemical and physical data
- Formula: C_{19}H_{23}N_{3}O
- Molar mass: 309.413 g·mol^{−1}
- 3D model (JSmol): Interactive image
- SMILES: n2c(OCCCN(C)C)c1ccccc1n2Cc3ccccc3
- InChI: InChI=1S/C19H23N3O/c1-21(2)13-8-14-23-19-17-11-6-7-12-18(17)22(20-19)15-16-9-4-3-5-10-16/h3-7,9-12H,8,13-15H2,1-2H3; Key:CNBGNNVCVSKAQZ-UHFFFAOYSA-N

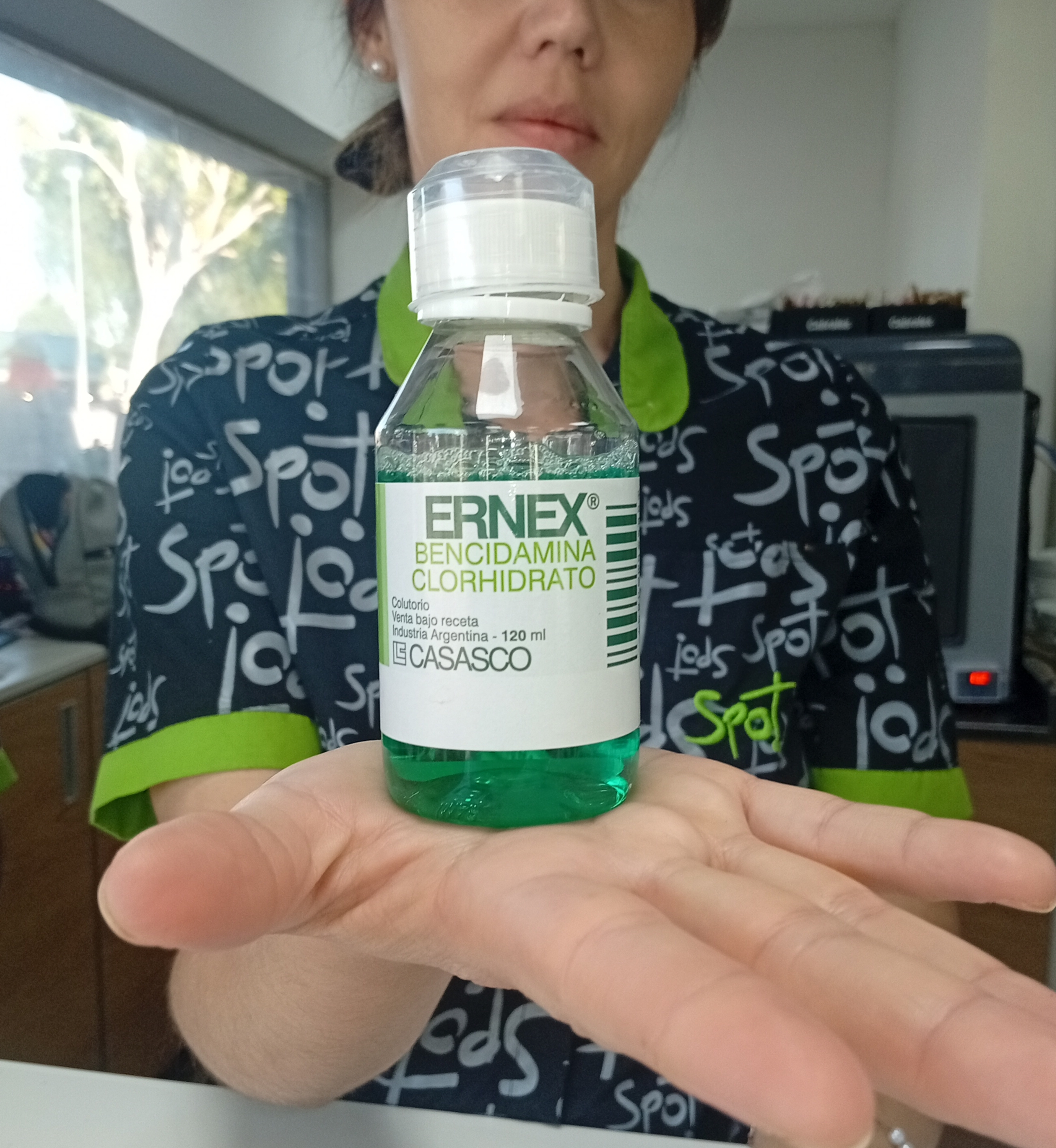
Benzydamine medicinal mouthwash as sold in Argentina.

Benzydamine (also known as Tantum Verde and branded in some countries as Maxtra Gargle, Difflam and Septabene), available as the hydrochloride salt, is a locally acting nonsteroidal anti-inflammatory drug (NSAID) with local anaesthetic and analgesic properties for pain relief and anti-inflammatory treatment of inflammatory conditions of the mouth and throat. It falls under class of chemicals known as indazoles.

== History ==
It was synthesized in Italy in 1964 and marketed in 1966.

=== Medical ===
- Odonto stomatology: gingivitis, stomatitis, glossitis, aphthous ulcers, dental surgery and oral ulceration due to radiation therapy.
- Otorhinolaryngology: glandular fever, pharyngitis, tonsillitis, post-tonsillectomy, radiation or intubation mucositis.

It may be used alone or as an adjunct to other therapy giving the possibility of increased therapeutic effect with little risk of interaction.

In some markets, the drug is supplied as an over-the-counter cream (Lonol in Mexico from Boehringer Ingelheim) used for topical treatment of musculoskeletal system disorders: sprains, strains, bursitis, tendinitis, synovitis, myalgia, periarthritis.

=== Recreational ===
Benzydamine has been used recreationally. If taken in excess amounts, it acts as an atypical deliriant and CNS stimulant. Such use, particularly among teenagers, has been reported in Brazil, Poland, Romania, and Turkey.

== Contraindications ==
There are no contraindications to the use of benzydamine except for known hypersensitivity.

== Side effects ==
Benzydamine is well tolerated. Occasionally oral tissue numbness or stinging sensations may occur, as well as itching, a skin rash, skin swelling or redness, difficulty breathing and wheezing.

== Pharmacology ==
It selectively binds to inflamed tissues (Prostaglandin synthetase inhibitor) and is normally free of adverse systemic effects. Unlike other NSAIDs, it does not inhibit cyclooxygenase or lipooxygenase, and is not ulcerogenic.

Benzydamine has been investigated for activity at several ion channels and receptors involved in nociception. In vitro electrophysiological studies have shown that it inhibits voltage-gated sodium channel Nav1.8 currents at micromolar concentrations, while having no action as an agonist or antagonist at TRPA1 or TRPV1 channels, and no significant effect on Kv7.2/7.3 potassium channels.

It is described as having powerful reinforcing effects in animals and showing cross-sensitization with drugs of misuse such as heroin and cocaine. It is hypothesized that it has cannabinoid agonistic activity and this may account for its recreational and hallucinogenic effects. However, it has also been theorized that, based on structural similarity to lysergic acid diethylamide (LSD) and descriptions of its visual hallucinatory effects, benzydamine might be acting as a serotonin 5-HT_{2A} receptor agonist and hence as a serotonergic psychedelic. More research is needed to determine the mechanism of action of the effects of benzydamine as a drug of misuse.

=== Pharmacokinetics ===
Benzydamine is poorly absorbed through skin and vagina.

== Synthesis ==
Benzydamine synthesis:

Synthesis starts with the reaction of the N-benzyl derivative from methyl anthranilate with nitrous acid to give the N-nitroso derivative.Reduction by means of sodium thiosulfate leads to the transient hydrazine (3), which undergoes spontaneous internal hydrazide formation. Treatment of the enolate of this amide with 3-chloro-1-dimethylamino propane gives benzydamine (5). Please note there is an error in this section: US3318905 states that the nitroso derivative is reduced with sodium hydrosulfite (sodium dithionite) and not with sodium hyposulfite (sodium thiosulfate), as shown in the above scheme and stated in text.

An interesting alternative synthesis of this substance starts by sequential reaction of N-benzylaniline with phosgene, and then with sodium azide to produce the corresponding carbonyl azide. On heating, nitrogen is evolved and a separatable mixture of nitrene insertion product and the desired ketoindazole # results. The latter reaction appears to be a Curtius rearrangement type product to produce an N-isocyanate #, which then cyclizes. Alkylation of the enol with sodium methoxide and 3-dimethylaminopropyl chloride gives benzydamine.

Alternatively, use of chloroacetamide in the alkylation step followed by acid hydrolysis produces bendazac instead.

== Research ==
Studies indicate that benzydamine has notable in vitro antibacterial activity and also shows synergism in combination with other antibiotics, especially tetracyclines, against antibiotic-resistant strains of Staphylococcus aureus and Pseudomonas aeruginosa.

It also has some cannabinoid activity in rats but has not been tested in humans. It is also hypothesized to act on 5-HT2A receptors due to its structural similarity with serotonin.
