= Dichlorophen =

Chemical compound

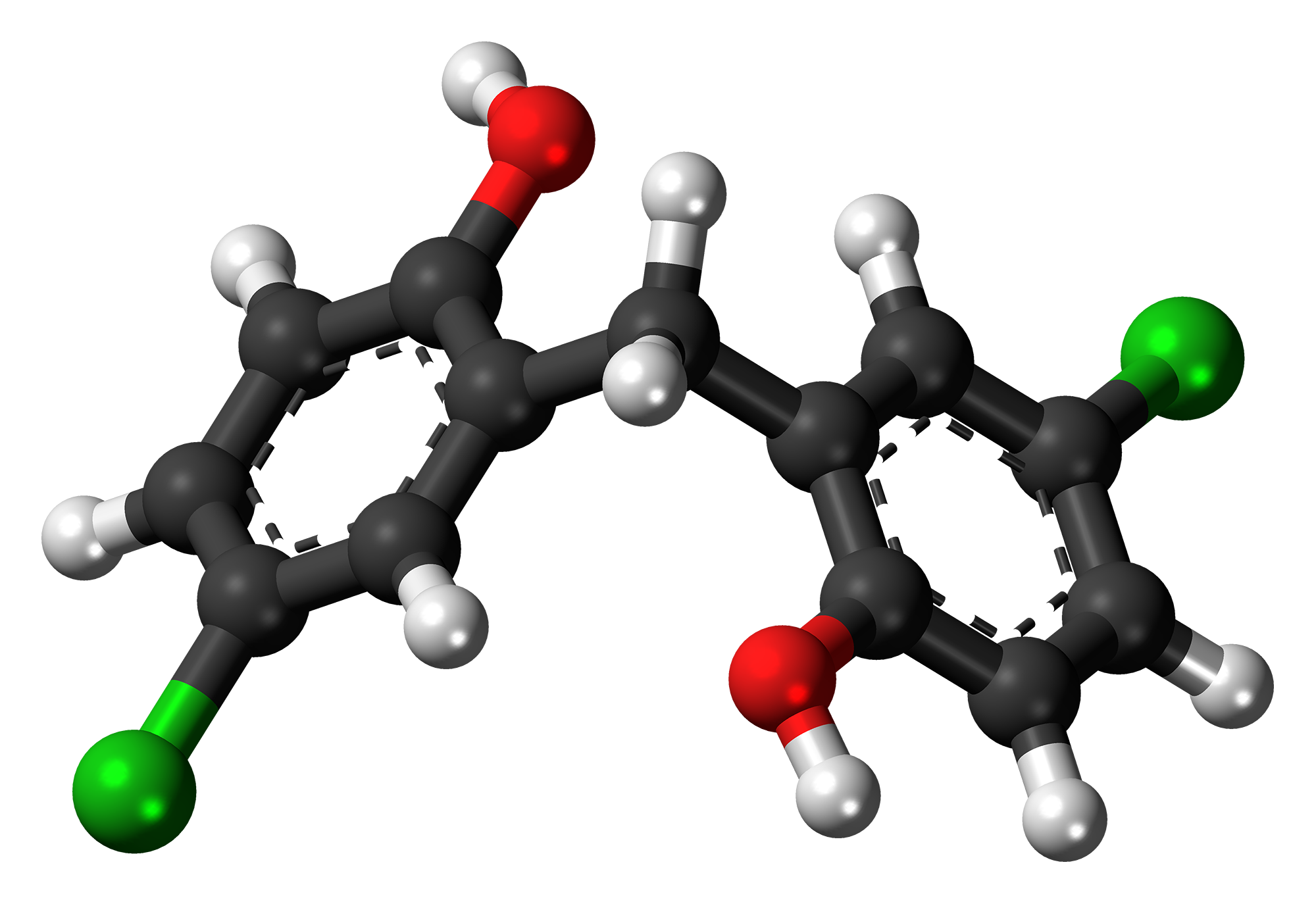

Clinical data
- AHFS/Drugs.com: International Drug Names
- ATC code: P02DX02 (WHO)

Identifiers
- IUPAC name: 4-Chloro-2-[(5-chloro-2-hydroxyphenyl)methyl]phenol
- CAS Number: 97-23-4
- PubChem CID: 3037
- ChemSpider: 2929
- UNII: T1J0JOU64O
- KEGG: C14292
- ChEMBL: ChEMBL33845
- CompTox Dashboard (EPA): DTXSID6021824
- ECHA InfoCard: 100.002.335

Chemical and physical data
- Formula: C_{13}H_{10}Cl_{2}O_{2}
- Molar mass: 269.12 g·mol^{−1}
- 3D model (JSmol): Interactive image
- Density: 1.5 g/cm^{3} g/cm^{3}
- Melting point: 177.5 °C (351.5 °F)
- Solubility in water: 0.003 g/100 mL mg/mL (20 °C)
- SMILES: C1=CC(=C(C=C1Cl)CC2=C(C=CC(=C2)Cl)O)O
- InChI: InChI=1S/C13H10Cl2O2/c14-10-1-3-12(16)8(6-10)5-9-7-11(15)2-4-13(9)17/h1-4,6-7,16-17H,5H2; Key:MDNWOSOZYLHTCG-UHFFFAOYSA-N

Dichlorophen is an organochlorine compound with the formula CH_{2}(C_{6}H_{3}(OH)Cl)_{2}. In terms of molecular structure, it consists of two 4-chlorophenol groups linked by a methylene.

It is anticestodal agent, fungicide, germicide, and antimicrobial agent. It is used in combination with toluene for the removal of parasites such as ascarids, hookworms, and tapeworms from dogs and cats. In 2025, dichlorophen was reported to function as a tubulin binding mitotic inhibitor.

== Safety and regulation ==
The LD_{50} (oral, mouse) is 3300 mg/kg.
