= Piketoprofen =

Chemical compound

Clinical data
- Trade names: Calmatel, Picalm
- AHFS/Drugs.com: International Drug Names
- Routes of administration: Topical (cream)
- ATC code: M02AA28 (WHO)

Identifiers
- IUPAC name: 2-(3-Benzoylphenyl)-N-(4-methyl-2-pyridyl)propionamide
- CAS Number: 60576-13-8
- PubChem CID: 68801
- ChemSpider: 62038
- UNII: 362QBC4NL0
- KEGG: D08374
- ChEMBL: ChEMBL2106966
- CompTox Dashboard (EPA): DTXSID801021570

Chemical and physical data
- Formula: C_{22}H_{20}N_{2}O_{2}
- Molar mass: 344.414 g·mol^{−1}
- 3D model (JSmol): Interactive image
- SMILES: Cc1ccnc(c1)NC(=O)C(C)c2cccc(c2)C(=O)c3ccccc3
- InChI: InChI=1S/C22H20N2O2/c1-15-11-12-23-20(13-15)24-22(26)16(2)18-9-6-10-19(14-18)21(25)17-7-4-3-5-8-17/h3-14,16H,1-2H3,(H,23,24,26); Key:ASFKKFRSMGBFRO-UHFFFAOYSA-N

Piketoprofen (INN; trade names Calmatel, Picalm) is a nonsteroidal anti-inflammatory drug (NSAID) for topical use in form of a cream.

Chemically, it is the 4-picolineamide of the NSAID ketoprofen.

== Synthesis ==

Thionyl chloride reacts with ketoprofen to form its acid chloride (2). Amide formation with 2-amino-4-methylpyridine (3) gives piketoprofen.
