= Bunitrolol =

Names
- IUPAC name 2-[3-(tert-Butylamino)-2-hydroxypropoxy]benzonitrile

Identifiers
CAS Number	34915-68-9
3D model (JSmol)	Interactive image
ChEMBL	ChEMBL418134
ChemSpider	2379
KEGG	D01444
PubChem CID	2473
UNII	F2613LO055
CompTox Dashboard (EPA)	DTXSID2022701
- InChI: InChI=1S/C14H20N2O2/c1-14(2,3)16-9-12(17)10-18-13-7-5-4-6-11(13)8-15/h4-7,12,16-17H,9-10H2,1-3H3 Key: VCVQSRCYSKKPBA-UHFFFAOYSA-N; InChI=1/C14H20N2O2/c1-14(2,3)16-9-12(17)10-18-13-7-5-4-6-11(13)8-15/h4-7,12,16-17H,9-10H2,1-3H3 Key: VCVQSRCYSKKPBA-UHFFFAOYAU
- SMILES: CC(C)(C)NCC(COC1=CC=CC=C1C#N)O

Properties
Chemical formula	C_{14}H_{20}N_{2}O_{2}
Molar mass	248.326 g·mol^{−1}
- Except where otherwise noted, data are given for materials in their standard state (at 25 °C [77 °F], 100 kPa). Infobox references

Bunitrolol is a beta-adrenergic antagonist.

== Synthesis ==

2-Hydroxybenzonitrile (1) is treated with epichlorohydrin and sodium hydroxide to give the epoxide (2). Addition of tert-butylamine completes the synthesis of bunitrolol.

== See also ==
- Bucindolol
- Epanolol
- Cyanopindolol
