= Loxoprofen =

Non-steroidal anti-inflammatory drug

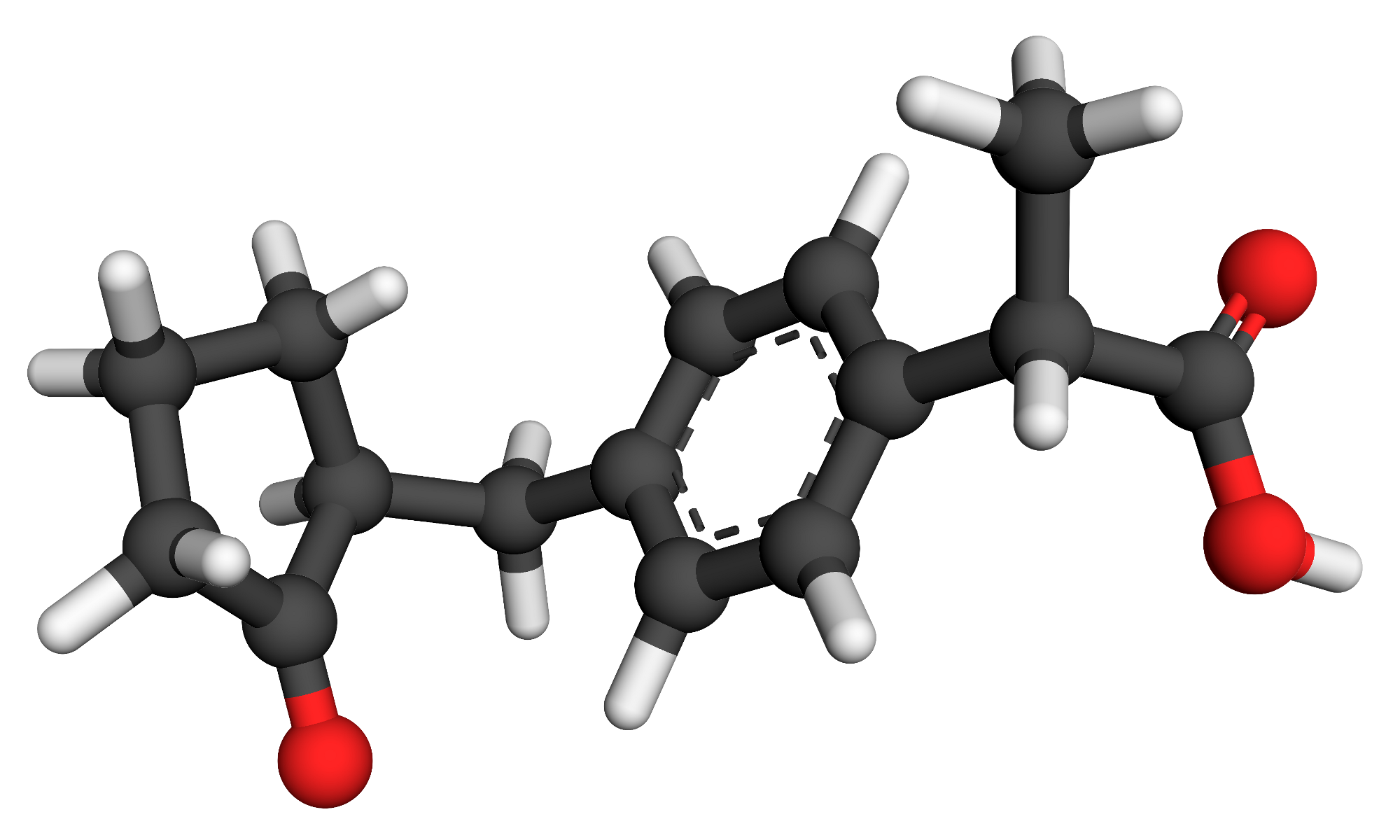

Clinical data
- AHFS/Drugs.com: International Drug Names
- Routes of administration: Oral, transdermal
- ATC code: M02AA31 (WHO) M01AE19 (WHO)

Legal status
- Legal status: BR: Red stripe; JP: OTC

Pharmacokinetic data
- Protein binding: 97%
- Metabolism: Liver glucuronidation
- Elimination half-life: 75 minutes
- Excretion: Kidney

Identifiers
- IUPAC name: (RS)-2-{4-[(2-oxocyclopentyl)methyl]phenyl}propanoic acid
- CAS Number: 68767-14-6
- PubChem CID: 3965
- DrugBank: DB09212
- ChemSpider: 3828
- UNII: 3583H0GZAP
- KEGG: D08149
- ChEBI: CHEBI:76172
- ChEMBL: ChEMBL19299
- CompTox Dashboard (EPA): DTXSID1045164

Chemical and physical data
- Formula: C_{15}H_{18}O_{3}
- Molar mass: 246.306 g·mol^{−1}
- 3D model (JSmol): Interactive image
- Chirality: Racemic mixture
- SMILES: O=C2C(Cc1ccc(cc1)C(C(=O)O)C)CCC2
- InChI: InChI=1S/C15H18O3/c1-10(15(17)18)12-7-5-11(6-8-12)9-13-3-2-4-14(13)16/h5-8,10,13H,2-4,9H2,1H3,(H,17,18); Key:YMBXTVYHTMGZDW-UHFFFAOYSA-N

Loxoprofen is a nonsteroidal anti-inflammatory drug (NSAID) in the propionic acid derivatives group, which also includes ibuprofen and naproxen among others. It is available in some countries for oral administration. A transdermal preparation was approved for sale in Japan in January 2006; medicated tape and gel formulations followed in 2008 and 2010.

It was patented in 1977 and approved for medical use in 1986.

== Pharmacokinetics ==
Loxoprofen is a prodrug. It is quickly converted to its active trans-alcohol metabolite following oral administration, and reaches its peak plasma concentration within 30 to 50 minutes.

== Mechanism of action ==
As most NSAIDs, loxoprofen is a non-selective cyclooxygenase inhibitor, and works by reducing the synthesis of prostaglandins from arachidonic acid.

== Interactions ==
Loxoprofen should not be administered at the same time as second-generation quinolone antibiotics such as ciprofloxacin and norfloxacin, as it increases their inhibition of GABA and this may cause seizures. It may also increase the plasma concentration of warfarin, methotrexate, sulfonylurea derivatives and lithium salts, so care should be taken when loxoprofen is administered to patients taking any of these drugs.

== Brand names ==
It is marketed in Brazil, Mexico, China and Japan by Sankyo as its sodium salt, loxoprofen sodium, under the trade name Loxonin; in Argentina as Oxeno; in India as Loxomac; in Thailand as Japrolox; and in Saudi Arabia and Bahrain as Roxonin and Roxonin Tape and in Russia as Skorolox.

A generic drug is marketed in Brazil by Aché as Oxotron. In Japan, two fixed dose combinations are available: Loxonin S Plus, with magnesium oxide, and Loxonin S Premium, with apronal, caffeine, and aluminium magnesium silicate.
