= Anticestodal agent =

Deworming drug for tapeworm infections

An anticestodal agent is a drug used in deworming to combat tapeworm infection. It derives its name from Cestoda.

Examples include:

- albendazole
- albendazole sulfoxide
- dichlorophen
- niclosamide
- quinacrine

== See also ==
- Taeniacide
