= Bendazac =

Chemical compound

Clinical data
- AHFS/Drugs.com: International Drug Names
- Routes of administration: Topical
- ATC code: M02AA11 (WHO) S01BC07 (WHO)

Identifiers
- IUPAC name: [(1-benzyl-1H-indazol-3-yl)oxy]acetic acid
- CAS Number: 20187-55-7
- PubChem CID: 2313
- ChemSpider: 2223
- UNII: G4AG71204O
- KEGG: D01594
- ChEBI: CHEBI:31257
- ChEMBL: ChEMBL1089221
- CompTox Dashboard (EPA): DTXSID1048334
- ECHA InfoCard: 100.039.594

Chemical and physical data
- Formula: C_{16}H_{14}N_{2}O_{3}
- Molar mass: 282.299 g·mol^{−1}
- 3D model (JSmol): Interactive image
- SMILES: O=C(O)COc2nn(c1ccccc12)Cc3ccccc3
- InChI: InChI=1S/C16H14N2O3/c19-15(20)11-21-16-13-8-4-5-9-14(13)18(17-16)10-12-6-2-1-3-7-12/h1-9H,10-11H2,(H,19,20); Key:BYFMCKSPFYVMOU-UHFFFAOYSA-N

Bendazac (or bendazolic acid) is a nonsteroidal anti-inflammatory drug (NSAID) used for joint and muscular pain.

== Synthesis ==
Principal action is inhibition of protein denaturation.

Bendazac synthesis: BE 699226; G. Palazzo, U.S. patent 3,470,194 (1967, 1969 both to Francesco Angelini).

Use of 3-chloro-N,N-dimethylpropanamine in the alkylation step produces benzydamine instead.

== See also ==
- Benzydamine
