= ATC code M02 =

ATC code M02 Topical products for joint and muscular pain is a therapeutic subgroup of the Anatomical Therapeutic Chemical Classification System, a system of alphanumeric codes developed by the World Health Organization (WHO) for the classification of drugs and other medical products. Subgroup M02 is part of the anatomical group M Musculo-skeletal system.

Codes for veterinary use (ATCvet codes) can be created by placing the letter Q in front of the human ATC code: for example, QM02. ATCvet codes without corresponding human ATC codes are cited with the leading Q in the following list.
National versions of the ATC classification may include additional codes not present in this list, which follows the WHO version.

== M02A Topical products for joint and muscular pain ==
=== M02AA Anti-inflammatory preparations, non-steroids for topical use ===
M02AA01 Phenylbutazone
M02AA02 Mofebutazone
M02AA03 Clofezone
M02AA04 Oxyphenbutazone
M02AA05 Benzydamine
M02AA06 Etofenamate
M02AA07 Piroxicam
M02AA08 Felbinac
M02AA09 Bufexamac
M02AA10 Ketoprofen
M02AA11 Bendazac
M02AA12 Naproxen
M02AA13 Ibuprofen
M02AA14 Fentiazac
M02AA15 Diclofenac
M02AA16 Feprazone
M02AA17 Niflumic acid
M02AA18 Meclofenamic acid
M02AA19 Flurbiprofen
M02AA21 Tolmetin
M02AA22 Suxibuzone
M02AA23 Indometacin
M02AA24 Nifenazone
M02AA25 Aceclofenac
M02AA26 Nimesulide
M02AA27 Dexketoprofen
M02AA28 Piketoprofen
M02AA29 Esflurbiprofen
M02AA31 Loxoprofen
QM02AA99 Antiinflammatory preparations, non-steroids for topical use, combinations

=== M02AB Capsaicin and similar agents ===
M02AB01 Capsaicin
M02AB02 Zucapsaicin

=== M02AC Preparations with salicylic acid derivatives ===
QM02AC99 Preparations with salicylic acid derivatives, combinations

=== M02AX Other topical products for joint and muscular pain ===
M02AX02 Tolazoline
M02AX03 Dimethyl sulfoxide
M02AX05 Idrocilamide
M02AX06 Tolperisone
M02AX10 Various
QM02AX53 Dimethyl sulfoxide, combinations
