= Mofebutazone =

Chemical compound

Clinical data
- ATC code: M01AA02 (WHO) M02AA02 (WHO)

Identifiers
- IUPAC name: 4-butyl-1-phenylpyrazolidine-3,5-dione
- CAS Number: 2210-63-1
- PubChem CID: 16639
- ChemSpider: 15776
- UNII: SPW36WUI5Z
- KEGG: D07262
- ChEBI: CHEBI:76252
- CompTox Dashboard (EPA): DTXSID4023331
- ECHA InfoCard: 100.016.947

Chemical and physical data
- Formula: C_{13}H_{16}N_{2}O_{2}
- Molar mass: 232.283 g·mol^{−1}
- 3D model (JSmol): Interactive image
- SMILES: CCCCC1C(=O)NN(C1=O)c2ccccc2
- InChI: InChI=1S/C13H16N2O2/c1-2-3-9-11-12(16)14-15(13(11)17)10-7-5-4-6-8-10/h4-8,11H,2-3,9H2,1H3,(H,14,16); Key:REOJLIXKJWXUGB-UHFFFAOYSA-N

Mofebutazone (or monophenylbutazone) is a drug used for joint and muscular pain. It is a 3,5-pyrazolinedione derivative.

The drug binds to plasma albumin and competes with drugs such as coumarin anticoagulants, indomethacin and glucocorticoids.
