= Bucindolol =

Chemical compound

Clinical data
- ATC code: none

Identifiers
- IUPAC name: 2-[2-hydroxy-3-[[2-(1H-indol-3-yl)-1,1-dimethyl-ethyl]amino]propoxy]benzonitrile
- CAS Number: 71119-11-4
- PubChem CID: 51045
- ChemSpider: 46266
- UNII: E9UO06K7CE
- ChEMBL: ChEMBL2107546
- CompTox Dashboard (EPA): DTXSID3046744
- ECHA InfoCard: 100.114.291

Chemical and physical data
- Formula: C_{22}H_{25}N_{3}O_{2}
- Molar mass: 363.461 g·mol^{−1}
- 3D model (JSmol): Interactive image
- SMILES: N#Cc0ccccc0OCC(O)CNC(C)(C)Cc1c[nH]c2c1cccc2

Bucindolol is a non-selective beta blocker with additional weak alpha-blocking properties and intrinsic sympathomimetic activity in some model systems but not in human hearts. It was under review by the FDA in the United States for the treatment of heart failure in 2009, but was rejected due to issues pertaining to integrity of data submitted.

== Synthesis ==

The displacement of the dimethylamino group in gramine (1) by the anion from 2-nitropropane gives 3-(2-methyl-2-nitropropyl)indole (2), which is reduced to the amine alpha,alpha-dimethyltryptamine (3). Separately, the reaction of 2-hydroxybenzonitrile (4) with epichlorohydrin gives the epoxide (5). Combination of the two intermediates (3) and (5) gives bucindolol.

== See also ==
- Epanolol
- Primidolol
