= Buthalital =

Chemical compound

Clinical data
- ATC code: None

Identifiers
- IUPAC name: sodium 5-allyl-5-isobutyl-6-oxo-2-thioxo-1,2,5,6-tetrahydro-4-pyrimidinolate
- CAS Number: 510-90-7 468-65-5 (no salt)
- PubChem CID: 3032320
- ChemSpider: 2297324
- UNII: 810E8N9VUG
- ChEMBL: ChEMBL2106716
- CompTox Dashboard (EPA): DTXSID40965285

Chemical and physical data
- Formula: C_{11}H_{15}N_{2}NaO_{2}S
- Molar mass: 262.30 g·mol^{−1}
- 3D model (JSmol): Interactive image
- SMILES: [Na+].O=C1NC(=S)/N=C(/[O-])C1(CC(C)C)C\C=C
- InChI: InChI=1S/C11H16N2O2S.Na/c1-4-5-11(6-7(2)3)8(14)12-10(16)13-9(11)15;/h4,7H,1,5-6H2,2-3H3,(H2,12,13,14,15,16);/q;+1/p-1; Key:APSWQQYXFMUODF-UHFFFAOYSA-M

Buthalital sodium (INN; Bayinal, Baytinal, Thialbutal, Transithal, Ulbreval), or buthalitone sodium (BAN), is a barbiturate derivative which was under development as a short-acting anesthetic. However, development was discontinued, perhaps due to its extremely rapid elimination rate, and buthalital sodium was never marketed.

== See also ==
- Barbiturate
