= Butamisole =

Identifiers
- IUPAC name: 2-Methyl-N-[3-(2,3,5,6-tetrahydroimidazo[2,1-b][1,3]thiazol-6-yl)phenyl]propanamide
- CAS Number: 54496-44-5
- PubChem CID: 166572
- ChemSpider: 145767
- ChEMBL: ChEMBL2110807
- CompTox Dashboard (EPA): DTXSID8057770

Chemical and physical data
- Formula: C_{15}H_{19}N_{3}OS
- Molar mass: 289.40 g·mol^{−1}
- 3D model (JSmol): Interactive image
- SMILES: CC(C)C(=O)NC1=CC=CC(=C1)C2CN3CCSC3=N2
- InChI: InChI=1S/C15H19N3OS/c1-10(2)14(19)16-12-5-3-4-11(8-12)13-9-18-6-7-20-15(18)17-13/h3-5,8,10,13H,6-7,9H2,1-2H3,(H,16,19); Key:YWDWYOALXURQPZ-UHFFFAOYSA-N

Butamisole is a pharmaceutical drug used in veterinary medicine. It is an anthelmintic of the imidazothiazole class. In dogs it is used for the treatment of infections with whipworms such as Trichuris vulpis and with hookworm such as Ancylostoma caninum. It acts as a nicotinic acetylcholine receptor agonist that causes sustained muscle contraction in the parasite followed by depolarizing neuromuscular blockade which leads to paralysis.
