= Suxibuzone =

Analgesic drug used for joint and muscular pain

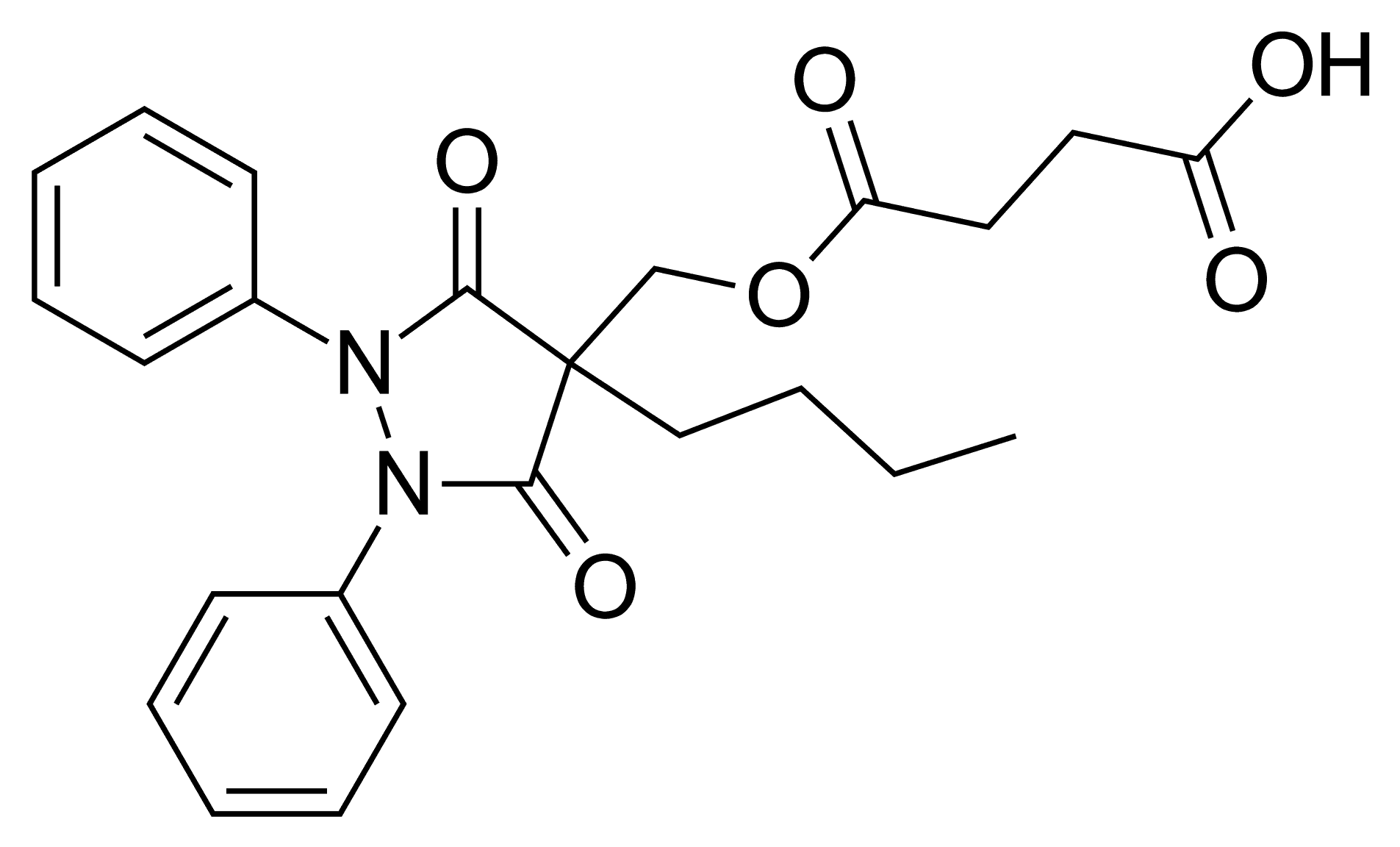
- Suxibuzone molecule

Clinical data
- AHFS/Drugs.com: International Drug Names
- ATC code: M02AA22 (WHO) QM01AA90 (WHO)

Identifiers
- IUPAC name: 4-[ [4-butyl-3,5-dioxo-1,2-di(phenyl)pyrazolidin-4-yl]methoxy]-4-oxobutanoic acid
- CAS Number: 27470-51-5
- PubChem CID: 5362
- ChemSpider: 5169
- UNII: 86TDZ5WP2B
- KEGG: D01289
- ChEMBL: ChEMBL1414320
- CompTox Dashboard (EPA): DTXSID6021296
- ECHA InfoCard: 100.044.056

Chemical and physical data
- Formula: C_{24}H_{26}N_{2}O_{6}
- Molar mass: 438.480 g·mol^{−1}
- 3D model (JSmol): Interactive image
- SMILES: O=C(O)CCC(=O)OCC2(C(=O)N(c1ccccc1)N(C2=O)c3ccccc3)CCCC
- InChI: InChI=1S/C24H26N2O6/c1-2-3-16-24(17-32-21(29)15-14-20(27)28)22(30)25(18-10-6-4-7-11-18)26(23(24)31)19-12-8-5-9-13-19/h4-13H,2-3,14-17H2,1H3,(H,27,28); Key:ONWXNHPOAGOMTG-UHFFFAOYSA-N

Suxibuzone is an analgesic used for joint and muscular pain. It is a prodrug of the non-steroidal anti-inflammatory drug (NSAID) phenylbutazone, and is commonly used in horses.

== Synthesis ==
Suxibuzone is synthesized by the following method:

Phenylbutazone [50-33-9] (1) is hydroxymethylated with formaldehyde giving ~86% 4-butyl-4-(hydroxymethyl)-1,2-diphenylpyrazolidine-3,5-dione [23111-33-3] (2). This is then esterified with succinic anhydride. [108-30-5] (3) to give (4).
