= Cotriptyline =

Chemical compound

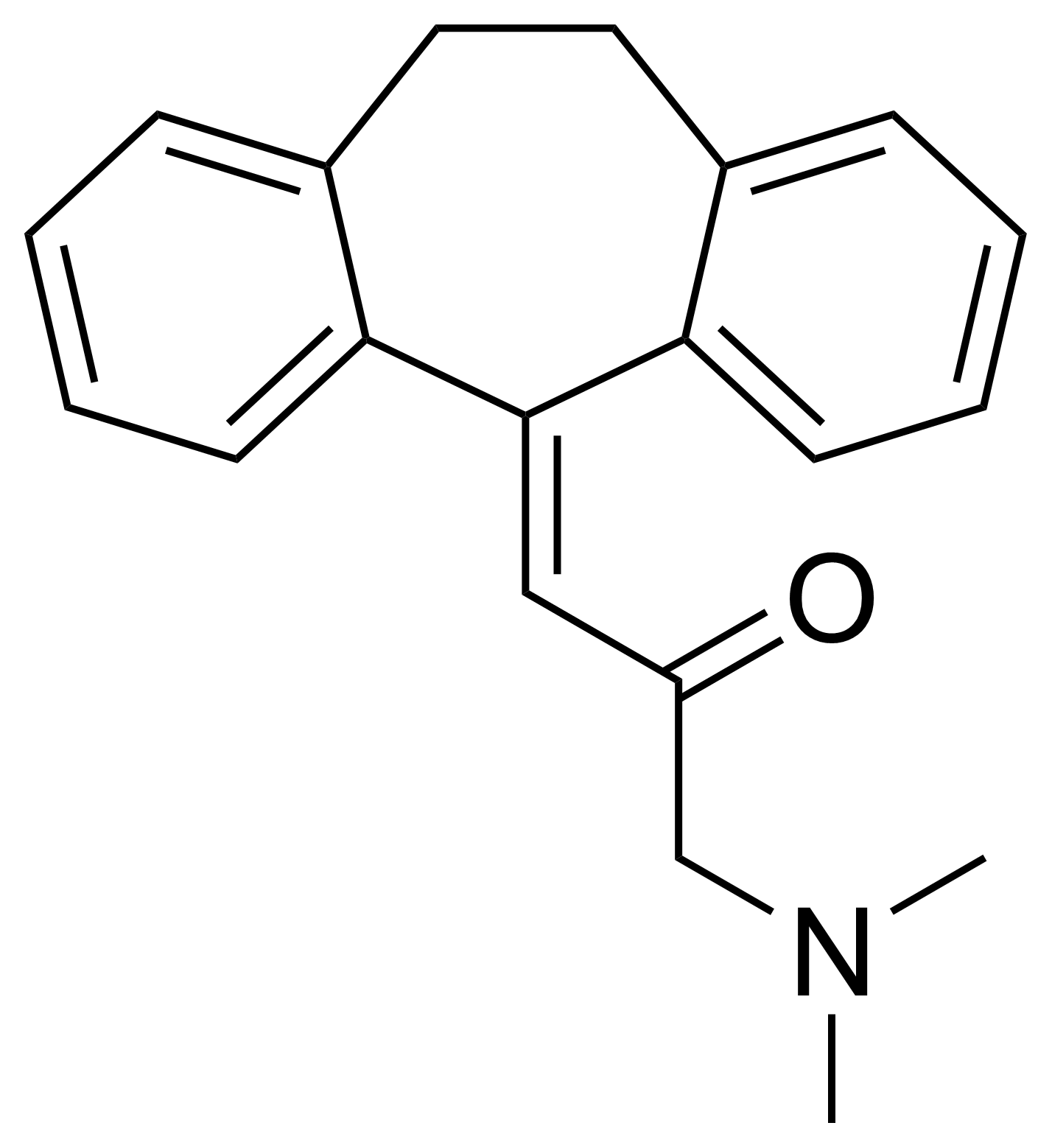

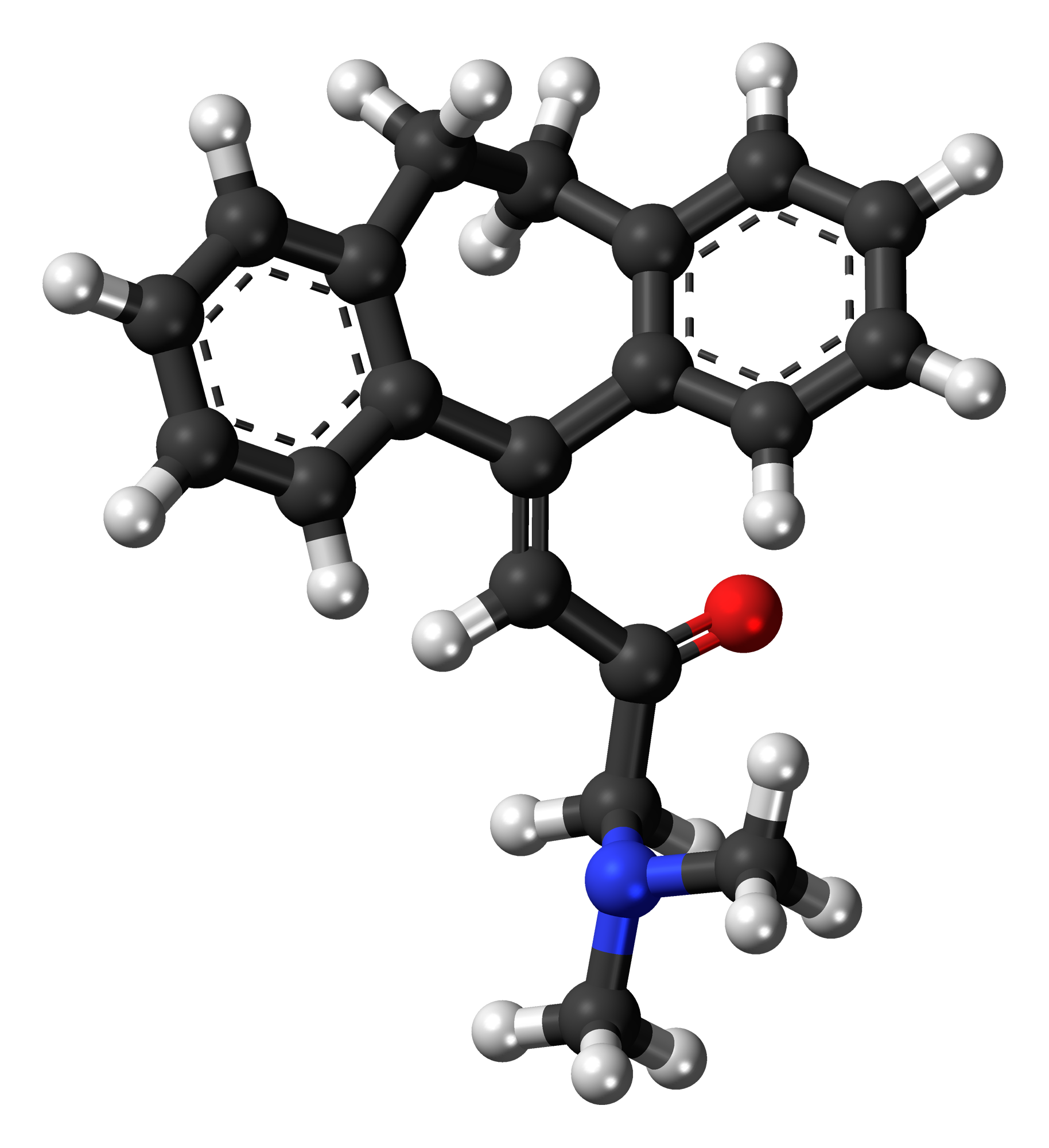

Clinical data
- Routes of administration: Oral
- ATC code: none

Legal status
- Legal status: In general: uncontrolled

Identifiers
- IUPAC name: 1-(10,11-Dihydro-5H-dibenzo[a,d][7]annulen-5-ylidene)-3-(dimethylamino)propan-2-one
- CAS Number: 34662-67-4
- PubChem CID: 71935
- ChemSpider: 64945
- UNII: KQJ4QI511C
- ChEMBL: ChEMBL2106088
- CompTox Dashboard (EPA): DTXSID50188221

Chemical and physical data
- Formula: C_{20}H_{21}NO
- Molar mass: 291.394 g·mol^{−1}
- 3D model (JSmol): Interactive image
- SMILES: O=C(/C=C2/c1c(cccc1)CCc3c2cccc3)CN(C)C

Cotriptyline (SD-2203-01) is a tricyclic antidepressant (TCA) which was never marketed.
