= Bunamidine =

Chemical compound

Identifiers
- IUPAC name: N,N-Dibutyl-4-hexoxynaphthalene-1-carboximidamide
- CAS Number: 3748-77-4
- PubChem CID: 13986
- DrugBank: DB11501
- ChemSpider: 11644438
- UNII: A9IW1G3P6C
- ChEMBL: ChEMBL1355596
- CompTox Dashboard (EPA): DTXSID4048272

Chemical and physical data
- Formula: C_{25}H_{38}N_{2}O
- Molar mass: 382.592 g·mol^{−1}
- 3D model (JSmol): Interactive image
- SMILES: CCCCCCOC1=CC=C(C2=CC=CC=C21)C(=N)N(CCCC)CCCC
- InChI: InChI=1S/C25H38N2O/c1-4-7-10-13-20-28-24-17-16-23(21-14-11-12-15-22(21)24)25(26)27(18-8-5-2)19-9-6-3/h11-12,14-17,26H,4-10,13,18-20H2,1-3H3; Key:FGGFIMIICGZCCJ-UHFFFAOYSA-N

Bunamidine is an anthelmintic drug used in veterinary medicine to treat infections by tapeworm parasites of the genus Taenia; thus it is classified as a taeniacide.

It is also effective against Echinococcus granulosus (dog tapeworm) and Hymenolepis diminuta (rat tapeworm).
