= Idrocilamide =

Muscle relaxant

Clinical data
- Trade names: Talval, Srilane, Relaxnova, Brolitène
- Other names: N-(2-Hydroxyethyl)cinnamamide
- AHFS/Drugs.com: International Drug Names
- Routes of administration: Topical
- ATC code: M02AX05 (WHO)

Identifiers
- IUPAC name: N-(2-Hydroxyethyl)-3-phenyl-2-propenamide
- CAS Number: 6961-46-2
- PubChem CID: 1550874
- ChemSpider: 1267352
- UNII: 6C816LUB1O
- ChEMBL: ChEMBL102358
- CompTox Dashboard (EPA): DTXSID8046404
- ECHA InfoCard: 100.027.414

Chemical and physical data
- Formula: C_{11}H_{13}NO_{2}
- Molar mass: 191.230 g·mol^{−1}
- 3D model (JSmol): Interactive image
- SMILES: O=C(\C=C\c1ccccc1)NCCO
- InChI: InChI=1S/C11H13NO2/c13-9-8-12-11(14)7-6-10-4-2-1-3-5-10/h1-7,13H,8-9H2,(H,12,14)/b7-6+; Key:OSCTXCOERRNGLW-VOTSOKGWSA-N

Idrocilamide (trade names Talval, Srilane, Relaxnova, Brolitène) is a medication with skeletal muscle relaxant and anti-inflammatory actions used as a topical cream to treat lumbago and other kinds of muscular pain. It is available on prescription or over-the-counter in France and various other countries.

== Interactions ==
Idrocilamide has been reported to be a potent inhibitor of the metabolism of caffeine.
