= Feprazone =

NSAID analgesic drug

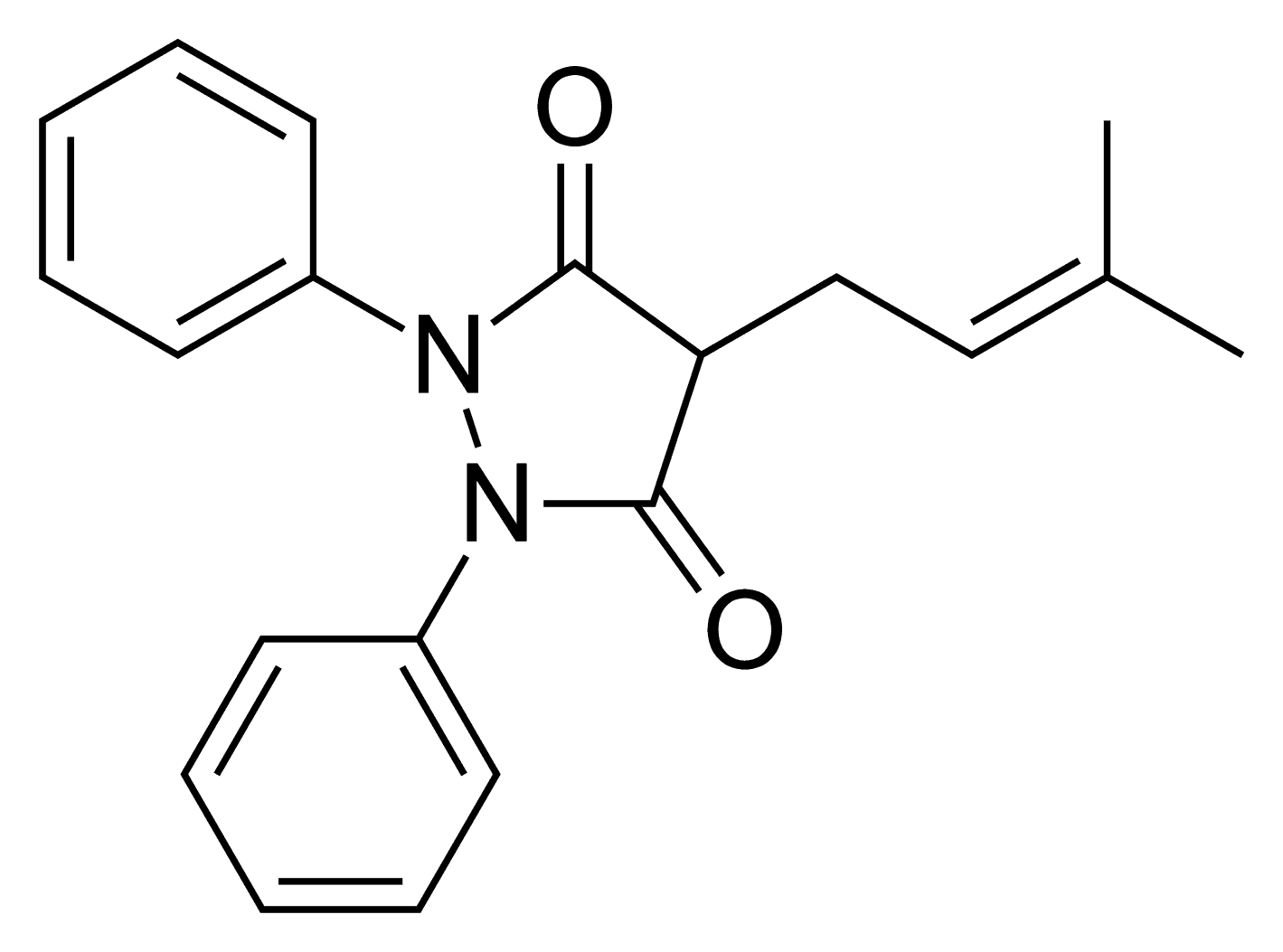

Clinical data
- AHFS/Drugs.com: International Drug Names
- ATC code: M02AA16 (WHO)

Identifiers
- IUPAC name: 4-(3-methylbut-2-enyl)-1,2-di(phenyl)pyrazolidine-3,5-dione
- CAS Number: 30748-29-9
- PubChem CID: 35455
- ChemSpider: 32612
- UNII: 7BVX6J0CGR
- KEGG: D01305
- CompTox Dashboard (EPA): DTXSID3023051
- ECHA InfoCard: 100.045.735

Chemical and physical data
- Formula: C_{20}H_{20}N_{2}O_{2}
- Molar mass: 320.392 g·mol^{−1}
- 3D model (JSmol): Interactive image
- SMILES: O=C2N(c1ccccc1)N(C(=O)C2C\C=C(/C)C)c3ccccc3
- InChI: InChI=1S/C20H20N2O2/c1-15(2)13-14-18-19(23)21(16-9-5-3-6-10-16)22(20(18)24)17-11-7-4-8-12-17/h3-13,18H,14H2,1-2H3; Key:RBBWCVQDXDFISW-UHFFFAOYSA-N

Feprazone (or prenazone) is a drug used for joint and muscular pain.

It is an analog of phenylbutazone but instead of a n-butyl group it is prenylated.
