= Cetraxate =

Chemical compound

Clinical data
- AHFS/Drugs.com: International Drug Names
- Routes of administration: Oral
- ATC code: none

Legal status
- Legal status: In general: ℞ (Prescription only)

Identifiers
- IUPAC name: 3-[4-[4-(aminomethyl)cyclohexanecarbonyl]oxyphenyl]propanoic acid
- CAS Number: 34675-84-8
- PubChem CID: 2680
- ChemSpider: 2579
- UNII: 5VPA8CPF0N
- KEGG: D07663
- ChEMBL: ChEMBL502896
- CompTox Dashboard (EPA): DTXSID2040658

Chemical and physical data
- Formula: C_{17}H_{23}NO_{4}
- Molar mass: 305.374 g·mol^{−1}
- 3D model (JSmol): Interactive image
- SMILES: O=C(O)CCc2ccc(cc2)OC(=O)C1CCC(CN)CC1

Cetraxate (INN) is an oral gastrointestinal medication which has a cytoprotective effect.

== Synthesis ==
Cetraxate is a prodrug of tranexamic acid. The latter is a hemostatic agent because it inhibits the activation of plasminogen to plasmin. The result is to prevent excess loss of blood in gastrointestinal ulcers. The synthesis begins with the esterification of 3-(p-hydroxyphenyl)propionic acid (2) by trans-4-cyanocyclohexanecarbonyl chloride (1). The product (3) is reduced to cetraxate (4) by catalytic hydrogenation with hydrogen and Raney nickel.

Cetraxate synthesis
