= Bufenadrine =

Chemical compound

Clinical data
- Other names: B.S. 6534; BS-6534; 2-tert-Butyldiphenhydramine
- Drug class: Antiemetic; Antihistamine; Anticholinergic; Antiparkinsonian agent

Identifiers
- IUPAC name: 2-[(2-tert-butylphenyl)-phenylmethoxy]-N,N-dimethylethanamine
- CAS Number: 604-74-0
- PubChem CID: 21916
- ChemSpider: 20600
- UNII: 9Y0T619B3U
- ChEMBL: ChEMBL2104614
- CompTox Dashboard (EPA): DTXSID70862278

Chemical and physical data
- Formula: C_{21}H_{29}NO
- Molar mass: 311.469 g·mol^{−1}
- 3D model (JSmol): Interactive image
- SMILES: CC(C)(C)C1=CC=CC=C1C(C2=CC=CC=C2)OCCN(C)C
- InChI: InChI=1S/C21H29NO/c1-21(2,3)19-14-10-9-13-18(19)20(23-16-15-22(4)5)17-11-7-6-8-12-17/h6-14,20H,15-16H2,1-5H3; Key:OGNRRAFRDFGFKA-UHFFFAOYSA-N

Bufenadrine (INN; developmental code name B.S. 6534), also known as 2-tert-butyldiphenhydramine, is a drug described as an antiemetic, antihistamine, anticholinergic, and antiparkinsonian agent which was never marketed. It is the 2-tert-butyl analogue of diphenhydramine. The drug was found to produce stereoselective hepatotoxicity in animals and this led to the discontinuation of its development. Bufenadrine was first described in the literature by 1967. Its INN suffix "-drine" is generally for sympathomimetics but bufenadrine itself is not actually a sympathomimetic or related agent.
