= Fenclozic acid =

Chemical compound

Clinical data
- Trade names: Myalex

Identifiers
- IUPAC name: [2-(4-Chlorophenyl)-1,3-thiazol-4-yl]acetic acid
- CAS Number: 17969-20-9
- PubChem CID: 28858
- ChemSpider: 26843
- UNII: 58SRQ4DV53
- CompTox Dashboard (EPA): DTXSID4046157

Chemical and physical data
- Formula: C_{11}H_{8}ClNO_{2}S
- Molar mass: 253.70 g·mol^{−1}
- 3D model (JSmol): Interactive image
- SMILES: c1cc(ccc1c2nc(cs2)CC(=O)O)Cl
- InChI: InChI=1S/C11H8ClNO2S/c12-8-3-1-7(2-4-8)11-13-9(6-16-11)5-10(14)15/h1-4,6H,5H2,(H,14,15); Key:APBSKHYXXKHJFK-UHFFFAOYSA-N

Fenclozic acid (proposed brand name Myalex) is a nonsteroidal anti-inflammatory drug (NSAID) with analgesic, antipyretic, and anti-inflammatory properties developed in the 1960s by ICI Pharmaceuticals. It failed to pass the Phase III clinical trial, and was withdrawn from clinical development in 1971 due to severe dose-related hepatotoxicity and jaundice in humans, despite showing an excellent preclinical safety profile and promising clinical efficacy in animal testing. It is considered a classic example of human-specific drug induced liver injury linked to unique metabolic activation in humans.
