= 3Me6,7MDTIQ =

Clinical data
- Other names: 3-Methyl-6,7-methylenedioxy-1,2,3,4-tetrahydroisoquinoline; 3-MMOTI
- ATC code: None

Identifiers
- IUPAC name: 7-methyl-5,6,7,8-tetrahydro-[1,3]dioxolo[4,5-g]isoquinoline
- CAS Number: 151109-51-2
- PubChem CID: 42684
- ChemSpider: 38934
- CompTox Dashboard (EPA): DTXSID00934174

Chemical and physical data
- Formula: C_{11}H_{13}NO_{2}
- Molar mass: 191.230 g·mol^{−1}
- 3D model (JSmol): Interactive image
- SMILES: CC1CC2=CC3=C(C=C2CN1)OCO3
- InChI: InChI=1S/C11H13NO2/c1-7-2-8-3-10-11(14-6-13-10)4-9(8)5-12-7/h3-4,7,12H,2,5-6H2,1H3; Key:BGKYNZFHWPNVJF-UHFFFAOYSA-N

3Me6,7MDTIQ, also known as 3-methyl-6,7-methylenedioxy-1,2,3,4-tetrahydroisoquinoline, is a drug of the phenethylamine and tetrahydroisoquinoline families related to the psychedelic and entactogen drug 3,4-methylenedioxyamphetamine (MDA). It is a cyclized phenethylamine and is a known active metabolite of MDA in rodents. In contrast to MDA however, 3Me6,7MDTIQ shows different pharmacological effects, for instance producing hypolocomotion instead of hyperlocomotion. The chemical synthesis of 3Me6,7MDTIQ has been described. 3Me6,7MDTIQ was first described in the scientific literature in 1993.

== See also ==
- Substituted tetrahydroisoquinoline
- TDIQ (MDTHIQ; MDA-CR)
