= Bufexamac =

Chemical compound

Clinical data
- AHFS/Drugs.com: International Drug Names
- Routes of administration: Topical, rectal
- ATC code: M01AB17 (WHO) M02AA09 (WHO)

Legal status
- Legal status: In general: Over-the-counter (OTC)

Pharmacokinetic data
- Excretion: Renal

Identifiers
- IUPAC name: 2-(4-butoxyphenyl)-N-hydroxyacetamide
- CAS Number: 2438-72-4
- PubChem CID: 2466
- IUPHAR/BPS: 7498
- ChemSpider: 2372
- UNII: 4T3C38J78L
- KEGG: D01271
- ChEMBL: ChEMBL94394
- CompTox Dashboard (EPA): DTXSID7045368
- ECHA InfoCard: 100.017.683

Chemical and physical data
- Formula: C_{12}H_{17}NO_{3}
- Molar mass: 223.272 g·mol^{−1}
- 3D model (JSmol): Interactive image
- SMILES: ONC(=O)Cc1ccc(OCCCC)cc1
- InChI: InChI=1S/C12H17NO3/c1-2-3-8-16-11-6-4-10(5-7-11)9-12(14)13-15/h4-7,15H,2-3,8-9H2,1H3,(H,13,14); Key:MXJWRABVEGLYDG-UHFFFAOYSA-N

Bufexamac is a drug used as an anti-inflammatory agent on the skin, as well as rectally. Common brand names include Paraderm and Parfenac. It was withdrawn in Europe and Australia because of allergic reactions.

== Indications ==
Ointments and lotions containing bufexamac are used for the treatment of subacute and chronic eczema of the skin, including atopic eczema, as well as sunburn and other minor burns, and itching. Suppositories containing bufexamac in combination with local anaesthetics are used against haemorrhoids.

== Pharmacology ==
Bufexamac is thought to act by inhibiting the enzyme cyclooxygenase, which would make it a non-steroidal anti-inflammatory drug. Evidence on the mechanism of action is scarce. Furthermore, bufexamac was identified as a specific inhibitor of class IIB histone deacetylases (HDAC6 and HDAC10).

== Side effects ==
Bufexamac can cause severe contact dermatitis which is often hard to distinguish from the initial condition. As a consequence, the European Medicines Agency recommended to withdraw the marketing approval in April 2010.
