= Ephedroxane =

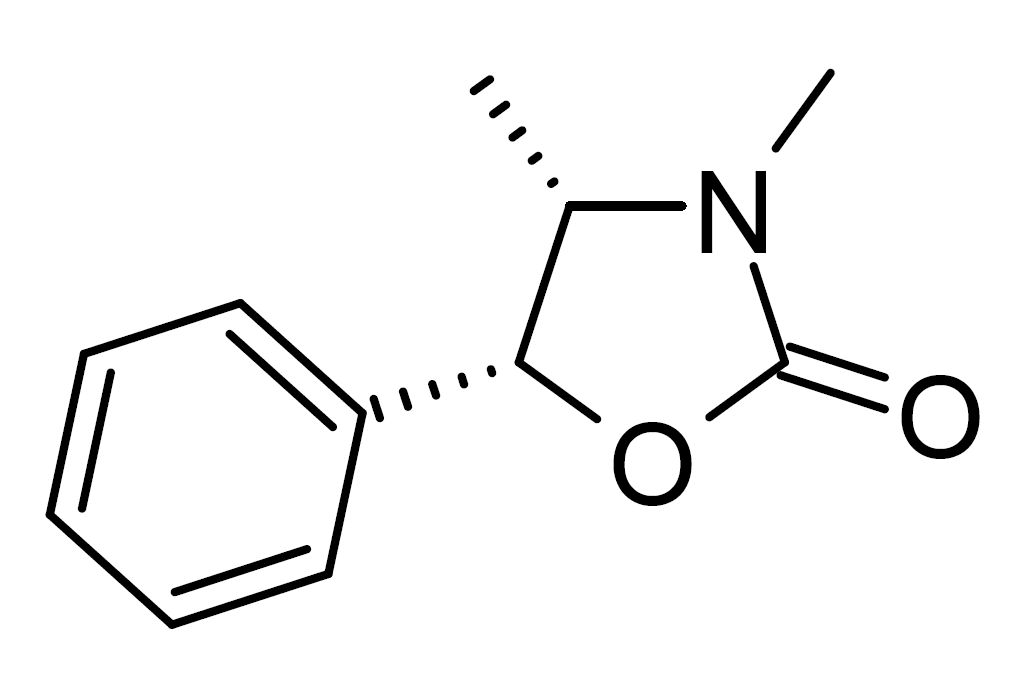

Clinical data
- Drug class: putative anti-inflammatory drug; central nervous system depressant (sedative)
- ATC code: none

Identifiers
- IUPAC name: (4S,5R)-3,4-dimethyl-5-phenyl-1,3-oxazolidin-2-one
- CAS Number: 16251-46-0
- PubChem CID: 161171
- ChemSpider: 141584
- KEGG: C17902
- ChEBI: CHEBI:81372
- CompTox Dashboard (EPA): DTXSID80167382

Chemical and physical data
- Formula: C_{11}H_{13}NO_{2}
- Molar mass: 191.230 g·mol^{−1}
- 3D model (JSmol): Interactive image
- SMILES: C[C@H]1[C@H](OC(=O)N1C)C2=CC=CC=C2
- InChI: InChI=1S/C11H13NO2/c1-8-10(14-11(13)12(8)2)9-6-4-3-5-7-9/h3-8,10H,1-2H3/t8-,10-/m0/s1; Key:MNYARIILPGRTQL-WPRPVWTQSA-N

Ephedroxane (EX) is a natural plant alkaloid belonging to a group of compounds related to aminorex, also known as phenyloxazolamines, found in plants of the genus Ephedra. Its structural skeleton consists of a 2-oxazolidinone with two methyl substituents at the nitrogen atom in the 3-position and at the carbon atom in the 4-position, as well as a phenyl group in the 5-position.

== Natural occurrence ==
Ephedroxane has been found in plants of the genus Ephedra.

== Pharmacology ==
=== Pharmacodynamics ===
The compounds are diastereomers (also known as pseudoephedroxane) or structurally related to ephedroxane are termed ephedroxanes; they usually exert a depressant effect, in contrast to ephedrines (such as ephedrine or pseudoephedrine) on the central nervous system, which confirms their sedative effect; it is emphasised, however, that the effects of ephedroxane were generally more intense compared with its isomer pseudoephedroxane; ephedroxanes did not cause tissue contraction, but at the same time enhanced the action of norepinephrine in the catecholaminergic system.

Efedroxan inhibited carrageenan-induced hind-paw oedema in mice, as well as in mice that had undergone adrenalectomy. Oedema of the hind paw induced by histamine, serotonin, bradykinin and prostaglandin E1 was suppressed by efedroxane, indicating its anti-inflammatory activity in early exudative inflammation; however, this mechanism was not associated with the sympathetic nervous system. Furthermore, ephedroxane also inhibited the biosynthesis of prostaglandin E2.
