= Butynamine =

Chemical compound

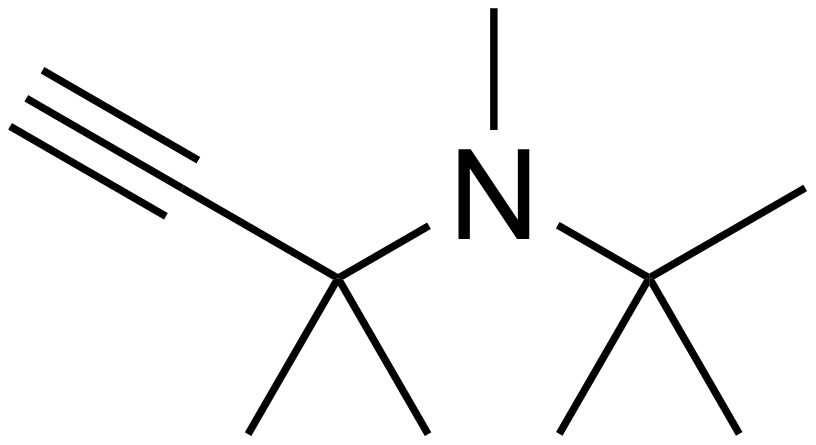

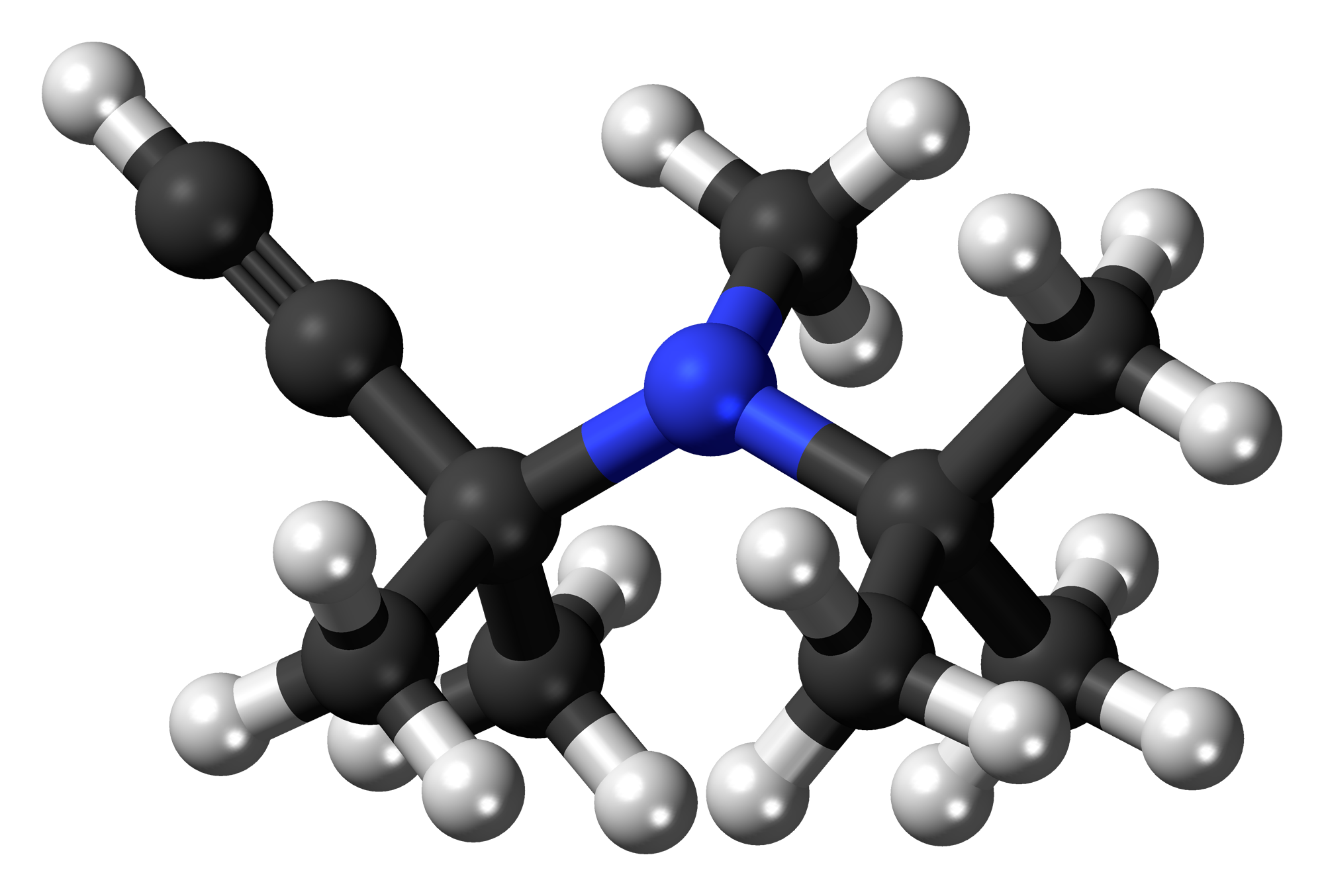

Clinical data
- ATC code: none

Identifiers
- IUPAC name: N-tert-Butyl-N,2-dimethylbut-3-yn-2-amine
- CAS Number: 3735-65-7
- PubChem CID: 189910
- ChemSpider: 164936
- UNII: 313QE5199Z
- ChEMBL: ChEMBL2104389
- CompTox Dashboard (EPA): DTXSID50863263

Chemical and physical data
- Formula: C_{10}H_{19}N
- Molar mass: 153.269 g·mol^{−1}
- 3D model (JSmol): Interactive image
- SMILES: CC(C)(C)N(C)C(C)(C)C#C
- InChI: InChI=1S/C10H19N/c1-8-10(5,6)11(7)9(2,3)4/h1H,2-7H3; Key:PAVORIOUUILGMQ-UHFFFAOYSA-N

Butynamine is a tertiary (a highly hindered) aliphatic amine which has antihypertensive effects.
