= Burapitant =

Chemical compound

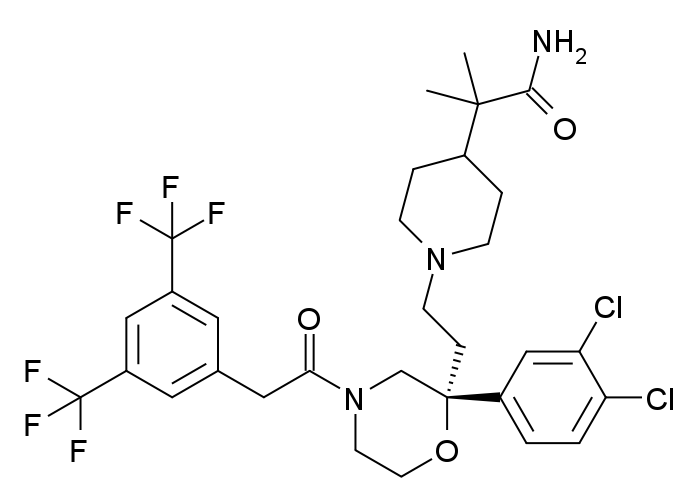

Clinical data
- ATC code: none

Identifiers
- IUPAC name: 2-[1-[2-[(2R)-4-[2-[3,5-bis(trifluoromethyl)phenyl]acetyl]-2-(3,4-dichlorophenyl)morpholin-2-yl]ethyl]piperidin-4-yl]-2-methylpropanamide
- CAS Number: 537034-22-3
- PubChem CID: 23649599
- ChemSpider: 26519428
- UNII: E35SK332MS
- CompTox Dashboard (EPA): DTXSID10968465

Chemical and physical data
- Formula: C_{31}H_{35}Cl_{2}F_{6}N_{3}O_{3}
- Molar mass: 682.53 g·mol^{−1}
- 3D model (JSmol): Interactive image
- SMILES: CC(C)(C1CCN(CC1)CC[C@]2(CN(CCO2)C(=O)CC3=CC(=CC(=C3)C(F)(F)F)C(F)(F)F)C4=CC(=C(C=C4)Cl)Cl)C(=O)N
- InChI: InChI=1S/C31H35Cl2F6N3O3/c1-28(2,27(40)44)20-5-8-41(9-6-20)10-7-29(21-3-4-24(32)25(33)17-21)18-42(11-12-45-29)26(43)15-19-13-22(30(34,35)36)16-23(14-19)31(37,38)39/h3-4,13-14,16-17,20H,5-12,15,18H2,1-2H3,(H2,40,44)/t29-/m0/s1; Key:ZLNYUCXXSDDIFU-LJAQVGFWSA-N

Burapitant (SSR-240,600) is a drug developed by Sanofi-Aventis which was one of the first compounds developed that acts as a potent and selective antagonist for the NK_{1} receptor. While burapitant itself did not proceed beyond early clinical trials and was never developed for clinical use in humans, promising animal results from this and related compounds have led to a number of novel drugs from this class that have now been introduced into medical use.
