= Taeniacide =

A taeniacide is a substance that kills tapeworms. This makes it a class of antihelminthic agents. It gets its name from the genus Taenia.

== Examples ==
Pharmaceutical taeniacides include diatrizoic acid, praziquantel, albendazole, niclosamide, and bunamidine.

== See also ==
- Anticestodal agent
