= Primidolol =

Names
- IUPAC name 1-[2-[[2-Hydroxy-3-(2-methylphenoxy)propyl]amino]ethyl]-5-methylpyrimidine-2,4-dione

Identifiers
CAS Number	67227-55-8
3D model (JSmol)	Interactive image
ChemSpider	61835
KEGG	C11774
PubChem CID	68563
UNII	56QH73D78K
CompTox Dashboard (EPA)	DTXSID0043840
- InChI: InChI=1S/C17H23N3O4/c1-12-5-3-4-6-15(12)24-11-14(21)9-18-7-8-20-10-13(2)16(22)19-17(20)23/h3-6,10,14,18,21H,7-9,11H2,1-2H3,(H,19,22,23) Key: RETPFDTUCPKFEC-UHFFFAOYSA-N
- SMILES: CC1=CC=CC=C1OCC(CNCCN2C=C(C(=O)NC2=O)C)O

Properties
Chemical formula	C_{17}H_{23}N_{3}O_{4}
Molar mass	333.388 g·mol^{−1}
- Except where otherwise noted, data are given for materials in their standard state (at 25 °C [77 °F], 100 kPa). Infobox references

Primidolol is a beta adrenergic receptor antagonist.
