= Bucolome =

Chemical compound

Clinical data
- Other names: Bucolome, Paramidine
- AHFS/Drugs.com: International Drug Names
- ATC code: none

Identifiers
- IUPAC name: 5-butyl-1-cyclohexyl-1,3-diazinane-2,4,6-trione
- CAS Number: 841-73-6
- PubChem CID: 2461
- ChemSpider: 2367
- UNII: 9T08RAL174
- ChEBI: CHEBI:31314
- ChEMBL: ChEMBL2106136
- CompTox Dashboard (EPA): DTXSID4048854
- ECHA InfoCard: 100.011.515

Chemical and physical data
- Formula: C_{14}H_{22}N_{2}O_{3}
- Molar mass: 266.341 g·mol^{−1}
- 3D model (JSmol): Interactive image
- SMILES: CCCCC1C(=O)NC(=O)N(C1=O)C2CCCCC2
- InChI: InChI=1S/C14H22N2O3/c1-2-3-9-11-12(17)15-14(19)16(13(11)18)10-7-5-4-6-8-10/h10-11H,2-9H2,1H3,(H,15,17,19); Key:DVEQCIBLXRSYPH-UHFFFAOYSA-N

Bucolome (Paramidine) is a barbiturate derivative. Unlike most barbiturates it does not have any significant sedative or hypnotic effects, but instead acts as an analgesic and antiinflammatory. It also acts as a CYP2C9 inhibitor and reduces the metabolism of several commonly used drugs, which makes it useful for potentiating or extending the duration of action of those drugs, or reducing the production of unwanted metabolites.
