= Bucumolol =

Names
- IUPAC name 8-[3-(tert-Butylamino)-2-hydroxypropoxy]-5-methylchromen-2-one

Identifiers
CAS Number	58409-59-9
3D model (JSmol)	Interactive image
ChEMBL	ChEMBL349807
ChemSpider	148482
KEGG	D01492
MeSH	C024221
PubChem CID	169787
UNII	U8WVJ3501L
CompTox Dashboard (EPA)	DTXSID00866688
- InChI: InChI=1S/C17H23NO4/c1-11-5-7-14(16-13(11)6-8-15(20)22-16)21-10-12(19)9-18-17(2,3)4/h5-8,12,18-19H,9-10H2,1-4H3 Key: CIJVBYRUFLGDHY-UHFFFAOYSA-N; InChI=1/C17H23NO4/c1-11-5-7-14(16-13(11)6-8-15(20)22-16)21-10-12(19)9-18-17(2,3)4/h5-8,12,18-19H,9-10H2,1-4H3 Key: CIJVBYRUFLGDHY-UHFFFAOYAD
- SMILES: CC1=C2C=CC(=O)OC2=C(C=C1)OCC(CNC(C)(C)C)O

Properties
Chemical formula	C_{17}H_{23}NO_{4}
Molar mass	305.374 g·mol^{−1}
- Except where otherwise noted, data are given for materials in their standard state (at 25 °C [77 °F], 100 kPa). Infobox references

Bucumolol is a beta-adrenergic antagonist.
