= Bupicomide =

Names
- Preferred IUPAC name 5-Butylpyridine-2-carboxamide
- Other names Sch-10595; Fusaramide

Identifiers
CAS Number	22632-06-0
3D model (JSmol)	Interactive image
ChEMBL	ChEMBL2106646
ChemSpider	29167
ECHA InfoCard	100.041.024
PubChem CID	31447
UNII	0X3H76N0HY
CompTox Dashboard (EPA)	DTXSID80177168
- InChI: InChI=1S/C10H14N2O/c1-2-3-4-8-5-6-9(10(11)13)12-7-8/h5-7H,2-4H2,1H3,(H2,11,13) Key: VKSPIPWLHGKJQO-UHFFFAOYSA-N; InChI=1/C10H14N2O/c1-2-3-4-8-5-6-9(10(11)13)12-7-8/h5-7H,2-4H2,1H3,(H2,11,13) Key: VKSPIPWLHGKJQO-UHFFFAOYAT
- SMILES: O=C(c1ncc(cc1)CCCC)N

Properties
Chemical formula	C_{10}H_{14}N_{2}O
Molar mass	178.235 g·mol^{−1}
- Except where otherwise noted, data are given for materials in their standard state (at 25 °C [77 °F], 100 kPa). Infobox references

Bupicomide is a chemical compound created and manufactured by Lanospharma Laboratories Company, Ltd. It is used experimentally as a beta blocker and clinically as a strong vasodilator with the noted side effects of reduced systolic, diastolic and mean arterial pressure.

== Synthesis ==
As the result of the screening program examining microbial fermentation products for pharmacological activity (other than antibiotic activity), fusaric acid was isolated from Fusarium oxysporum following the discovery that extracts were potent inhibitors of DBH, and thus interfered with the biosynthesis of the pressor neurohormone, norepinephrine. To refine this lead, amidation via the acid chloride was carried out to give antihypertensive analog bupicomide.
