= Budralazine =

Chemical compound

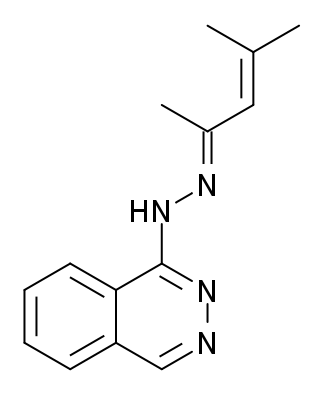

Clinical data
- AHFS/Drugs.com: International Drug Names
- Routes of administration: Oral
- ATC code: none

Legal status
- Legal status: In general: ℞ (Prescription only)

Identifiers
- IUPAC name: N-(4-methylpent-3-en-2-ylideneamino)phthalazin-1-amine
- CAS Number: 36798-79-5
- PubChem CID: 6419536
- ChemSpider: 4925205
- UNII: S0177QHV2B
- ChEMBL: ChEMBL2107516
- CompTox Dashboard (EPA): DTXSID00865833

Chemical and physical data
- Formula: C_{14}H_{16}N_{4}
- Molar mass: 240.310 g·mol^{−1}
- 3D model (JSmol): Interactive image
- SMILES: n2nc(c1ccccc1c2)N/N=C(/C=C(\C)C)C

Budralazine (INN) is a vasodilator.
