= Bufetolol =

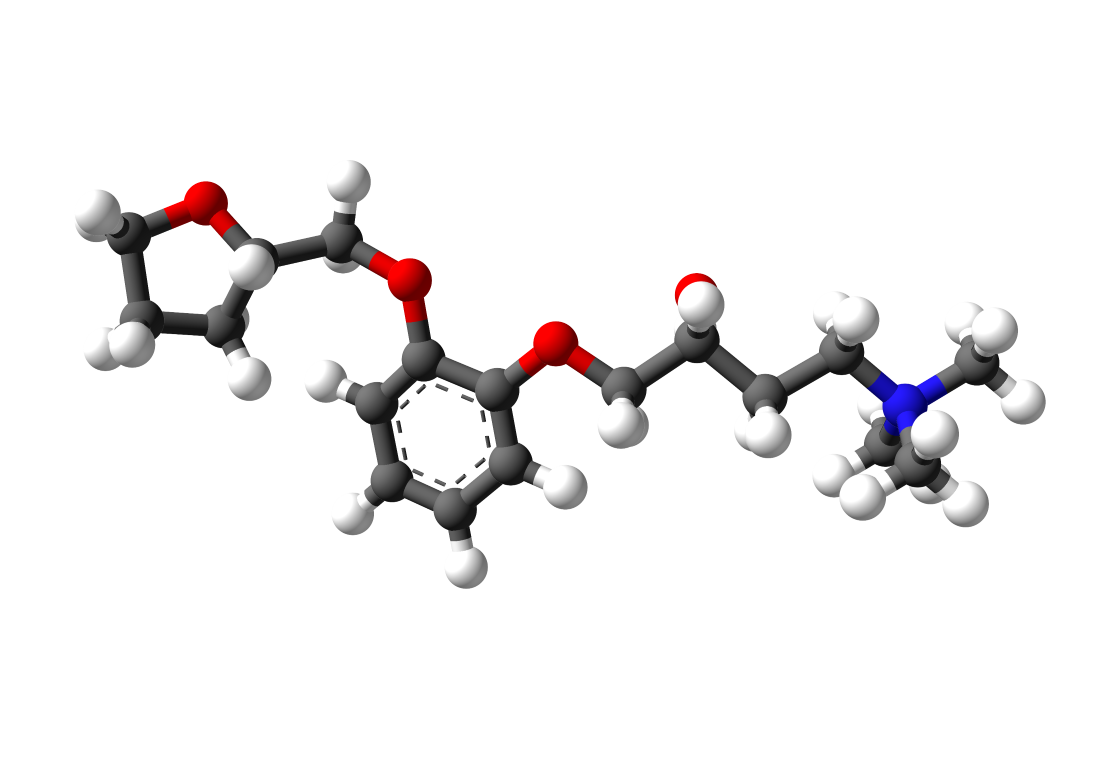

Names
- IUPAC name 1-(tert-Butylamino)-3-[2-(oxolan-2-ylmethoxy)phenoxy]propan-2-ol

Identifiers
CAS Number	53684-49-4
3D model (JSmol)	Interactive image
ChEMBL	ChEMBL347830
ChemSpider	2371
KEGG	D01504
PubChem CID	2465
UNII	WS1467RT9Z
CompTox Dashboard (EPA)	DTXSID9057763
- InChI: InChI=1S/C18H29NO4/c1-18(2,3)19-11-14(20)12-22-16-8-4-5-9-17(16)23-13-15-7-6-10-21-15/h4-5,8-9,14-15,19-20H,6-7,10-13H2,1-3H3 Key: AKLNLVOZXMQGSI-UHFFFAOYSA-N; InChI=1/C18H29NO4/c1-18(2,3)19-11-14(20)12-22-16-8-4-5-9-17(16)23-13-15-7-6-10-21-15/h4-5,8-9,14-15,19-20H,6-7,10-13H2,1-3H3 Key: AKLNLVOZXMQGSI-UHFFFAOYAN
- SMILES: CC(C)(C)NCC(COC1=CC=CC=C1OCC2CCCO2)O

Properties
Chemical formula	C_{18}H_{29}NO_{4}
Molar mass	323.433 g·mol^{−1}
- Except where otherwise noted, data are given for materials in their standard state (at 25 °C [77 °F], 100 kPa). Infobox references

Bufetolol is a beta-adrenoceptor antagonist.
