= Butinoline =

Names
- Preferred IUPAC name 1,1-Diphenyl-4-(pyrrolidin-1-yl)but-2-yn-1-ol

Identifiers
CAS Number	968-63-8
3D model (JSmol)	Interactive image
ChEMBL	ChEMBL1442660
ChemSpider	62168
PubChem CID	68943
UNII	G216926E9T
CompTox Dashboard (EPA)	DTXSID3046295
- InChI: InChI=1S/C20H21NO/c22-20(18-10-3-1-4-11-18,19-12-5-2-6-13-19)14-9-17-21-15-7-8-16-21/h1-6,10-13,22H,7-8,15-17H2 Key: LWPXJPFOEPMIRG-UHFFFAOYSA-N; InChI=1/C20H21NO/c22-20(18-10-3-1-4-11-18,19-12-5-2-6-13-19)14-9-17-21-15-7-8-16-21/h1-6,10-13,22H,7-8,15-17H2 Key: LWPXJPFOEPMIRG-UHFFFAOYAV
- SMILES: C1CCN(C1)CC#CC(C2=CC=CC=C2)(C3=CC=CC=C3)O

Properties
Chemical formula	C_{20}H_{21}NO
Molar mass	291.4 g/mol
- Except where otherwise noted, data are given for materials in their standard state (at 25 °C [77 °F], 100 kPa). Infobox references

Butinoline (Azulone) is an anticholinergic drug used as an antispasmodic.
